

248001–248100 

|-bgcolor=#E9E9E9
| 248001 ||  || — || February 17, 2004 || Catalina || CSS || PAE || align=right | 5.6 km || 
|-id=002 bgcolor=#E9E9E9
| 248002 ||  || — || March 12, 2004 || Palomar || NEAT || HNA || align=right | 3.9 km || 
|-id=003 bgcolor=#d6d6d6
| 248003 ||  || — || March 15, 2004 || Goodricke-Pigott || R. A. Tucker || — || align=right | 5.4 km || 
|-id=004 bgcolor=#d6d6d6
| 248004 ||  || — || March 12, 2004 || Palomar || NEAT || HIL3:2 || align=right | 6.7 km || 
|-id=005 bgcolor=#E9E9E9
| 248005 ||  || — || March 13, 2004 || Palomar || NEAT || GEF || align=right | 2.2 km || 
|-id=006 bgcolor=#E9E9E9
| 248006 ||  || — || March 15, 2004 || Kitt Peak || Spacewatch || — || align=right | 3.3 km || 
|-id=007 bgcolor=#E9E9E9
| 248007 ||  || — || March 15, 2004 || Kitt Peak || Spacewatch || PAD || align=right | 2.6 km || 
|-id=008 bgcolor=#d6d6d6
| 248008 ||  || — || March 15, 2004 || Socorro || LINEAR || MEL || align=right | 4.5 km || 
|-id=009 bgcolor=#d6d6d6
| 248009 ||  || — || March 14, 2004 || Palomar || NEAT || — || align=right | 5.4 km || 
|-id=010 bgcolor=#d6d6d6
| 248010 ||  || — || March 15, 2004 || Kitt Peak || Spacewatch || — || align=right | 3.5 km || 
|-id=011 bgcolor=#E9E9E9
| 248011 ||  || — || March 15, 2004 || Kitt Peak || Spacewatch || — || align=right | 1.9 km || 
|-id=012 bgcolor=#E9E9E9
| 248012 ||  || — || March 15, 2004 || Kitt Peak || Spacewatch || — || align=right | 3.9 km || 
|-id=013 bgcolor=#d6d6d6
| 248013 ||  || — || March 15, 2004 || Kitt Peak || Spacewatch || — || align=right | 4.1 km || 
|-id=014 bgcolor=#d6d6d6
| 248014 ||  || — || March 16, 2004 || Catalina || CSS || EUP || align=right | 5.9 km || 
|-id=015 bgcolor=#E9E9E9
| 248015 ||  || — || March 16, 2004 || Kitt Peak || Spacewatch || WIT || align=right | 1.6 km || 
|-id=016 bgcolor=#E9E9E9
| 248016 ||  || — || March 16, 2004 || Kitt Peak || Spacewatch || KON || align=right | 3.3 km || 
|-id=017 bgcolor=#d6d6d6
| 248017 ||  || — || March 17, 2004 || Socorro || LINEAR || TIR || align=right | 5.5 km || 
|-id=018 bgcolor=#fefefe
| 248018 ||  || — || March 27, 2004 || Socorro || LINEAR || H || align=right data-sort-value="0.74" | 740 m || 
|-id=019 bgcolor=#d6d6d6
| 248019 ||  || — || March 16, 2004 || Kitt Peak || Spacewatch || — || align=right | 5.1 km || 
|-id=020 bgcolor=#d6d6d6
| 248020 ||  || — || March 18, 2004 || Socorro || LINEAR || SAN || align=right | 2.2 km || 
|-id=021 bgcolor=#d6d6d6
| 248021 ||  || — || March 19, 2004 || Palomar || NEAT || — || align=right | 4.6 km || 
|-id=022 bgcolor=#d6d6d6
| 248022 ||  || — || March 19, 2004 || Socorro || LINEAR || — || align=right | 4.4 km || 
|-id=023 bgcolor=#E9E9E9
| 248023 ||  || — || March 20, 2004 || Socorro || LINEAR || — || align=right | 2.8 km || 
|-id=024 bgcolor=#E9E9E9
| 248024 ||  || — || March 17, 2004 || Kitt Peak || Spacewatch || — || align=right | 2.8 km || 
|-id=025 bgcolor=#E9E9E9
| 248025 ||  || — || March 17, 2004 || Kitt Peak || Spacewatch || — || align=right | 1.6 km || 
|-id=026 bgcolor=#d6d6d6
| 248026 ||  || — || March 18, 2004 || Socorro || LINEAR || — || align=right | 4.4 km || 
|-id=027 bgcolor=#d6d6d6
| 248027 ||  || — || March 18, 2004 || Socorro || LINEAR || URS || align=right | 6.3 km || 
|-id=028 bgcolor=#d6d6d6
| 248028 ||  || — || March 22, 2004 || Anderson Mesa || LONEOS || — || align=right | 5.1 km || 
|-id=029 bgcolor=#E9E9E9
| 248029 ||  || — || March 27, 2004 || Socorro || LINEAR || — || align=right | 4.9 km || 
|-id=030 bgcolor=#E9E9E9
| 248030 ||  || — || March 16, 2004 || Kitt Peak || Spacewatch || — || align=right | 2.1 km || 
|-id=031 bgcolor=#d6d6d6
| 248031 ||  || — || April 9, 2004 || Siding Spring || SSS || Tj (2.98) || align=right | 4.8 km || 
|-id=032 bgcolor=#d6d6d6
| 248032 ||  || — || April 12, 2004 || Palomar || NEAT || — || align=right | 5.1 km || 
|-id=033 bgcolor=#d6d6d6
| 248033 ||  || — || April 12, 2004 || Kitt Peak || Spacewatch || EUP || align=right | 5.2 km || 
|-id=034 bgcolor=#fefefe
| 248034 ||  || — || April 12, 2004 || Anderson Mesa || LONEOS || FLO || align=right | 1.7 km || 
|-id=035 bgcolor=#d6d6d6
| 248035 ||  || — || April 12, 2004 || Kitt Peak || Spacewatch || — || align=right | 3.0 km || 
|-id=036 bgcolor=#d6d6d6
| 248036 ||  || — || April 13, 2004 || Siding Spring || SSS || ALA || align=right | 6.6 km || 
|-id=037 bgcolor=#E9E9E9
| 248037 ||  || — || April 12, 2004 || Kitt Peak || Spacewatch || — || align=right | 4.0 km || 
|-id=038 bgcolor=#d6d6d6
| 248038 ||  || — || April 13, 2004 || Palomar || NEAT || — || align=right | 4.9 km || 
|-id=039 bgcolor=#d6d6d6
| 248039 ||  || — || April 12, 2004 || Catalina || CSS || HYG || align=right | 3.2 km || 
|-id=040 bgcolor=#E9E9E9
| 248040 ||  || — || April 14, 2004 || Palomar || NEAT || DOR || align=right | 4.5 km || 
|-id=041 bgcolor=#fefefe
| 248041 ||  || — || April 19, 2004 || Socorro || LINEAR || H || align=right | 1.3 km || 
|-id=042 bgcolor=#fefefe
| 248042 ||  || — || April 19, 2004 || Kitt Peak || Spacewatch || — || align=right | 1.1 km || 
|-id=043 bgcolor=#E9E9E9
| 248043 ||  || — || April 21, 2004 || Socorro || LINEAR || — || align=right | 3.3 km || 
|-id=044 bgcolor=#d6d6d6
| 248044 ||  || — || April 21, 2004 || Socorro || LINEAR || — || align=right | 3.3 km || 
|-id=045 bgcolor=#d6d6d6
| 248045 ||  || — || April 23, 2004 || Kitt Peak || Spacewatch || — || align=right | 4.4 km || 
|-id=046 bgcolor=#d6d6d6
| 248046 ||  || — || April 24, 2004 || Socorro || LINEAR || — || align=right | 4.0 km || 
|-id=047 bgcolor=#d6d6d6
| 248047 ||  || — || April 26, 2004 || Socorro || LINEAR || — || align=right | 4.6 km || 
|-id=048 bgcolor=#C2FFFF
| 248048 ||  || — || April 24, 2004 || Kitt Peak || Spacewatch || L4 || align=right | 17 km || 
|-id=049 bgcolor=#fefefe
| 248049 ||  || — || May 13, 2004 || Socorro || LINEAR || H || align=right | 1.5 km || 
|-id=050 bgcolor=#d6d6d6
| 248050 ||  || — || May 9, 2004 || Kitt Peak || Spacewatch || TIR || align=right | 2.4 km || 
|-id=051 bgcolor=#d6d6d6
| 248051 ||  || — || May 9, 2004 || Kitt Peak || Spacewatch || — || align=right | 2.6 km || 
|-id=052 bgcolor=#E9E9E9
| 248052 ||  || — || May 14, 2004 || Palomar || NEAT || ADE || align=right | 4.2 km || 
|-id=053 bgcolor=#d6d6d6
| 248053 ||  || — || May 23, 2004 || Kitt Peak || Spacewatch || — || align=right | 1.6 km || 
|-id=054 bgcolor=#E9E9E9
| 248054 ||  || — || May 27, 2004 || Reedy Creek || J. Broughton || — || align=right | 5.0 km || 
|-id=055 bgcolor=#d6d6d6
| 248055 ||  || — || June 10, 2004 || Campo Imperatore || CINEOS || — || align=right | 4.4 km || 
|-id=056 bgcolor=#d6d6d6
| 248056 ||  || — || June 11, 2004 || Anderson Mesa || LONEOS || — || align=right | 7.1 km || 
|-id=057 bgcolor=#fefefe
| 248057 ||  || — || June 15, 2004 || Socorro || LINEAR || — || align=right | 3.1 km || 
|-id=058 bgcolor=#d6d6d6
| 248058 ||  || — || June 12, 2004 || Socorro || LINEAR || — || align=right | 6.7 km || 
|-id=059 bgcolor=#d6d6d6
| 248059 ||  || — || June 13, 2004 || Kitt Peak || Spacewatch || — || align=right | 4.7 km || 
|-id=060 bgcolor=#fefefe
| 248060 ||  || — || June 13, 2004 || Socorro || LINEAR || — || align=right | 3.1 km || 
|-id=061 bgcolor=#d6d6d6
| 248061 ||  || — || June 18, 2004 || Anderson Mesa || LONEOS || EUP || align=right | 5.9 km || 
|-id=062 bgcolor=#d6d6d6
| 248062 ||  || — || June 25, 2004 || Reedy Creek || J. Broughton || — || align=right | 3.6 km || 
|-id=063 bgcolor=#fefefe
| 248063 ||  || — || July 11, 2004 || Socorro || LINEAR || — || align=right | 1.8 km || 
|-id=064 bgcolor=#d6d6d6
| 248064 ||  || — || July 11, 2004 || Anderson Mesa || LONEOS || EUP || align=right | 6.3 km || 
|-id=065 bgcolor=#E9E9E9
| 248065 || 2004 OZ || — || July 16, 2004 || Campo Imperatore || CINEOS || — || align=right | 2.8 km || 
|-id=066 bgcolor=#E9E9E9
| 248066 ||  || — || July 21, 2004 || Reedy Creek || J. Broughton || — || align=right | 2.8 km || 
|-id=067 bgcolor=#d6d6d6
| 248067 ||  || — || July 25, 2004 || Anderson Mesa || LONEOS || — || align=right | 4.6 km || 
|-id=068 bgcolor=#d6d6d6
| 248068 ||  || — || August 7, 2004 || Palomar || NEAT || — || align=right | 5.1 km || 
|-id=069 bgcolor=#fefefe
| 248069 ||  || — || August 7, 2004 || Palomar || NEAT || ERI || align=right | 2.6 km || 
|-id=070 bgcolor=#d6d6d6
| 248070 ||  || — || August 8, 2004 || Socorro || LINEAR || THB || align=right | 5.4 km || 
|-id=071 bgcolor=#d6d6d6
| 248071 ||  || — || August 7, 2004 || Palomar || NEAT || — || align=right | 2.9 km || 
|-id=072 bgcolor=#d6d6d6
| 248072 ||  || — || August 8, 2004 || Socorro || LINEAR || — || align=right | 2.6 km || 
|-id=073 bgcolor=#d6d6d6
| 248073 ||  || — || August 8, 2004 || Socorro || LINEAR || — || align=right | 4.6 km || 
|-id=074 bgcolor=#d6d6d6
| 248074 ||  || — || August 8, 2004 || Campo Imperatore || CINEOS || — || align=right | 5.2 km || 
|-id=075 bgcolor=#d6d6d6
| 248075 ||  || — || August 9, 2004 || Socorro || LINEAR || EOS || align=right | 3.5 km || 
|-id=076 bgcolor=#fefefe
| 248076 ||  || — || August 10, 2004 || Socorro || LINEAR || — || align=right data-sort-value="0.83" | 830 m || 
|-id=077 bgcolor=#d6d6d6
| 248077 ||  || — || August 10, 2004 || Socorro || LINEAR || — || align=right | 5.4 km || 
|-id=078 bgcolor=#d6d6d6
| 248078 ||  || — || August 12, 2004 || Socorro || LINEAR || — || align=right | 6.1 km || 
|-id=079 bgcolor=#d6d6d6
| 248079 ||  || — || August 11, 2004 || Siding Spring || SSS || — || align=right | 5.6 km || 
|-id=080 bgcolor=#d6d6d6
| 248080 ||  || — || August 12, 2004 || Socorro || LINEAR || — || align=right | 4.1 km || 
|-id=081 bgcolor=#d6d6d6
| 248081 ||  || — || August 16, 2004 || Siding Spring || SSS || — || align=right | 2.2 km || 
|-id=082 bgcolor=#fefefe
| 248082 ||  || — || August 26, 2004 || Catalina || CSS || FLO || align=right | 1.3 km || 
|-id=083 bgcolor=#FFC2E0
| 248083 ||  || — || August 27, 2004 || Catalina || CSS || AMO +1km || align=right | 2.4 km || 
|-id=084 bgcolor=#fefefe
| 248084 ||  || — || August 27, 2004 || Anderson Mesa || LONEOS || KLI || align=right | 2.7 km || 
|-id=085 bgcolor=#d6d6d6
| 248085 ||  || — || September 3, 2004 || Palomar || NEAT || EUP || align=right | 6.6 km || 
|-id=086 bgcolor=#E9E9E9
| 248086 ||  || — || September 3, 2004 || Palomar || NEAT || — || align=right | 2.1 km || 
|-id=087 bgcolor=#d6d6d6
| 248087 ||  || — || September 4, 2004 || Palomar || NEAT || — || align=right | 5.6 km || 
|-id=088 bgcolor=#d6d6d6
| 248088 ||  || — || September 6, 2004 || Needville || Needville Obs. || HYG || align=right | 4.0 km || 
|-id=089 bgcolor=#d6d6d6
| 248089 ||  || — || September 7, 2004 || Socorro || LINEAR || Tj (2.99) || align=right | 4.4 km || 
|-id=090 bgcolor=#d6d6d6
| 248090 ||  || — || September 7, 2004 || Socorro || LINEAR || — || align=right | 6.0 km || 
|-id=091 bgcolor=#fefefe
| 248091 ||  || — || September 8, 2004 || Socorro || LINEAR || FLO || align=right | 1.7 km || 
|-id=092 bgcolor=#d6d6d6
| 248092 ||  || — || September 8, 2004 || Socorro || LINEAR || HYG || align=right | 5.3 km || 
|-id=093 bgcolor=#d6d6d6
| 248093 ||  || — || September 8, 2004 || Socorro || LINEAR || VER || align=right | 5.6 km || 
|-id=094 bgcolor=#E9E9E9
| 248094 ||  || — || September 8, 2004 || Socorro || LINEAR || — || align=right | 3.6 km || 
|-id=095 bgcolor=#d6d6d6
| 248095 ||  || — || September 8, 2004 || Socorro || LINEAR || THM || align=right | 4.3 km || 
|-id=096 bgcolor=#d6d6d6
| 248096 ||  || — || September 8, 2004 || Socorro || LINEAR || — || align=right | 3.9 km || 
|-id=097 bgcolor=#E9E9E9
| 248097 ||  || — || September 8, 2004 || Socorro || LINEAR || — || align=right | 3.5 km || 
|-id=098 bgcolor=#d6d6d6
| 248098 ||  || — || September 7, 2004 || Bergisch Gladbach || W. Bickel || slow || align=right | 7.0 km || 
|-id=099 bgcolor=#d6d6d6
| 248099 ||  || — || September 7, 2004 || Palomar || NEAT || — || align=right | 4.7 km || 
|-id=100 bgcolor=#d6d6d6
| 248100 ||  || — || September 8, 2004 || Socorro || LINEAR || EOS || align=right | 5.1 km || 
|}

248101–248200 

|-bgcolor=#d6d6d6
| 248101 ||  || — || September 8, 2004 || Socorro || LINEAR || — || align=right | 3.9 km || 
|-id=102 bgcolor=#d6d6d6
| 248102 ||  || — || September 8, 2004 || Socorro || LINEAR || EOS || align=right | 3.4 km || 
|-id=103 bgcolor=#d6d6d6
| 248103 ||  || — || September 8, 2004 || Socorro || LINEAR || 7:4 || align=right | 5.7 km || 
|-id=104 bgcolor=#E9E9E9
| 248104 ||  || — || September 8, 2004 || Socorro || LINEAR || — || align=right | 2.6 km || 
|-id=105 bgcolor=#d6d6d6
| 248105 ||  || — || September 8, 2004 || Socorro || LINEAR || — || align=right | 4.8 km || 
|-id=106 bgcolor=#fefefe
| 248106 ||  || — || September 8, 2004 || Palomar || NEAT || ERI || align=right | 3.1 km || 
|-id=107 bgcolor=#FA8072
| 248107 ||  || — || September 9, 2004 || Kitt Peak || Spacewatch || — || align=right data-sort-value="0.95" | 950 m || 
|-id=108 bgcolor=#d6d6d6
| 248108 ||  || — || September 7, 2004 || Kitt Peak || Spacewatch || MRC || align=right | 3.6 km || 
|-id=109 bgcolor=#d6d6d6
| 248109 ||  || — || September 8, 2004 || Socorro || LINEAR || — || align=right | 2.8 km || 
|-id=110 bgcolor=#fefefe
| 248110 ||  || — || September 8, 2004 || Palomar || NEAT || — || align=right | 3.6 km || 
|-id=111 bgcolor=#d6d6d6
| 248111 ||  || — || September 10, 2004 || Socorro || LINEAR || — || align=right | 4.6 km || 
|-id=112 bgcolor=#E9E9E9
| 248112 ||  || — || September 7, 2004 || Palomar || NEAT || MIT || align=right | 4.6 km || 
|-id=113 bgcolor=#d6d6d6
| 248113 ||  || — || September 8, 2004 || Palomar || NEAT || — || align=right | 5.5 km || 
|-id=114 bgcolor=#d6d6d6
| 248114 ||  || — || September 10, 2004 || Socorro || LINEAR || MEL || align=right | 6.1 km || 
|-id=115 bgcolor=#d6d6d6
| 248115 ||  || — || September 10, 2004 || Socorro || LINEAR || — || align=right | 5.0 km || 
|-id=116 bgcolor=#d6d6d6
| 248116 ||  || — || September 10, 2004 || Socorro || LINEAR || — || align=right | 3.9 km || 
|-id=117 bgcolor=#d6d6d6
| 248117 ||  || — || September 10, 2004 || Socorro || LINEAR || — || align=right | 5.1 km || 
|-id=118 bgcolor=#E9E9E9
| 248118 ||  || — || September 10, 2004 || Socorro || LINEAR || — || align=right | 4.0 km || 
|-id=119 bgcolor=#d6d6d6
| 248119 ||  || — || September 10, 2004 || Socorro || LINEAR || — || align=right | 4.8 km || 
|-id=120 bgcolor=#d6d6d6
| 248120 ||  || — || September 10, 2004 || Socorro || LINEAR || CRO || align=right | 5.7 km || 
|-id=121 bgcolor=#d6d6d6
| 248121 ||  || — || September 10, 2004 || Socorro || LINEAR || VER || align=right | 5.8 km || 
|-id=122 bgcolor=#E9E9E9
| 248122 ||  || — || September 10, 2004 || Socorro || LINEAR || — || align=right | 3.4 km || 
|-id=123 bgcolor=#E9E9E9
| 248123 ||  || — || September 10, 2004 || Socorro || LINEAR || — || align=right | 4.7 km || 
|-id=124 bgcolor=#d6d6d6
| 248124 ||  || — || September 11, 2004 || Socorro || LINEAR || — || align=right | 2.9 km || 
|-id=125 bgcolor=#d6d6d6
| 248125 ||  || — || September 11, 2004 || Socorro || LINEAR || — || align=right | 4.7 km || 
|-id=126 bgcolor=#fefefe
| 248126 ||  || — || September 11, 2004 || Socorro || LINEAR || — || align=right | 2.6 km || 
|-id=127 bgcolor=#d6d6d6
| 248127 ||  || — || September 11, 2004 || Socorro || LINEAR || — || align=right | 6.3 km || 
|-id=128 bgcolor=#d6d6d6
| 248128 ||  || — || September 10, 2004 || Socorro || LINEAR || — || align=right | 5.9 km || 
|-id=129 bgcolor=#d6d6d6
| 248129 ||  || — || September 15, 2004 || Anderson Mesa || LONEOS || — || align=right | 3.1 km || 
|-id=130 bgcolor=#d6d6d6
| 248130 ||  || — || September 14, 2004 || Anderson Mesa || LONEOS || — || align=right | 5.6 km || 
|-id=131 bgcolor=#d6d6d6
| 248131 ||  || — || September 17, 2004 || Kitt Peak || Spacewatch || HYG || align=right | 4.0 km || 
|-id=132 bgcolor=#d6d6d6
| 248132 ||  || — || September 17, 2004 || Kitt Peak || Spacewatch || EMA || align=right | 6.3 km || 
|-id=133 bgcolor=#d6d6d6
| 248133 ||  || — || September 17, 2004 || Socorro || LINEAR || HYG || align=right | 5.5 km || 
|-id=134 bgcolor=#E9E9E9
| 248134 ||  || — || September 18, 2004 || Socorro || LINEAR || — || align=right | 4.5 km || 
|-id=135 bgcolor=#fefefe
| 248135 ||  || — || September 18, 2004 || Socorro || LINEAR || — || align=right | 3.1 km || 
|-id=136 bgcolor=#d6d6d6
| 248136 ||  || — || September 21, 2004 || Socorro || LINEAR || — || align=right | 5.4 km || 
|-id=137 bgcolor=#E9E9E9
| 248137 ||  || — || September 21, 2004 || Socorro || LINEAR || — || align=right | 4.0 km || 
|-id=138 bgcolor=#d6d6d6
| 248138 ||  || — || September 22, 2004 || Socorro || LINEAR || — || align=right | 3.9 km || 
|-id=139 bgcolor=#d6d6d6
| 248139 ||  || — || September 17, 2004 || Kitt Peak || Spacewatch || — || align=right | 4.6 km || 
|-id=140 bgcolor=#d6d6d6
| 248140 ||  || — || September 21, 2004 || Anderson Mesa || LONEOS || — || align=right | 7.8 km || 
|-id=141 bgcolor=#d6d6d6
| 248141 ||  || — || October 4, 2004 || Kitt Peak || Spacewatch || SYL7:4 || align=right | 7.8 km || 
|-id=142 bgcolor=#d6d6d6
| 248142 ||  || — || October 5, 2004 || Anderson Mesa || LONEOS || EOS || align=right | 5.3 km || 
|-id=143 bgcolor=#d6d6d6
| 248143 ||  || — || October 7, 2004 || Socorro || LINEAR || VER || align=right | 5.7 km || 
|-id=144 bgcolor=#d6d6d6
| 248144 ||  || — || October 5, 2004 || Anderson Mesa || LONEOS || ALA || align=right | 6.3 km || 
|-id=145 bgcolor=#d6d6d6
| 248145 ||  || — || October 5, 2004 || Socorro || LINEAR || — || align=right | 5.0 km || 
|-id=146 bgcolor=#d6d6d6
| 248146 ||  || — || October 6, 2004 || Anderson Mesa || LONEOS || HYG || align=right | 3.5 km || 
|-id=147 bgcolor=#E9E9E9
| 248147 ||  || — || October 6, 2004 || Palomar || NEAT || MIT || align=right | 3.9 km || 
|-id=148 bgcolor=#fefefe
| 248148 ||  || — || October 7, 2004 || Kitt Peak || Spacewatch || — || align=right | 1.6 km || 
|-id=149 bgcolor=#d6d6d6
| 248149 ||  || — || October 7, 2004 || Kitt Peak || Spacewatch || — || align=right | 4.9 km || 
|-id=150 bgcolor=#E9E9E9
| 248150 ||  || — || October 7, 2004 || Kitt Peak || Spacewatch || — || align=right | 2.6 km || 
|-id=151 bgcolor=#fefefe
| 248151 ||  || — || October 7, 2004 || Kitt Peak || Spacewatch || FLO || align=right | 1.8 km || 
|-id=152 bgcolor=#E9E9E9
| 248152 ||  || — || October 7, 2004 || Kitt Peak || Spacewatch || — || align=right | 2.8 km || 
|-id=153 bgcolor=#fefefe
| 248153 ||  || — || October 8, 2004 || Kitt Peak || Spacewatch || — || align=right | 1.7 km || 
|-id=154 bgcolor=#E9E9E9
| 248154 ||  || — || October 8, 2004 || Socorro || LINEAR || — || align=right | 3.0 km || 
|-id=155 bgcolor=#d6d6d6
| 248155 ||  || — || October 10, 2004 || Kitt Peak || Spacewatch || 7:4 || align=right | 5.4 km || 
|-id=156 bgcolor=#E9E9E9
| 248156 ||  || — || October 13, 2004 || Kitt Peak || Spacewatch || ADE || align=right | 3.3 km || 
|-id=157 bgcolor=#d6d6d6
| 248157 ||  || — || October 14, 2004 || Palomar || NEAT || — || align=right | 7.8 km || 
|-id=158 bgcolor=#E9E9E9
| 248158 ||  || — || October 24, 2004 || Anderson Mesa || LONEOS || — || align=right | 2.5 km || 
|-id=159 bgcolor=#E9E9E9
| 248159 ||  || — || November 2, 2004 || Palomar || NEAT || — || align=right | 1.7 km || 
|-id=160 bgcolor=#E9E9E9
| 248160 ||  || — || November 3, 2004 || Anderson Mesa || LONEOS || ADE || align=right | 3.4 km || 
|-id=161 bgcolor=#E9E9E9
| 248161 ||  || — || November 3, 2004 || Anderson Mesa || LONEOS || — || align=right | 2.7 km || 
|-id=162 bgcolor=#E9E9E9
| 248162 ||  || — || November 3, 2004 || Palomar || NEAT || — || align=right | 3.5 km || 
|-id=163 bgcolor=#E9E9E9
| 248163 ||  || — || November 7, 2004 || Socorro || LINEAR || — || align=right | 3.4 km || 
|-id=164 bgcolor=#E9E9E9
| 248164 ||  || — || November 9, 2004 || Catalina || CSS || BRU || align=right | 5.9 km || 
|-id=165 bgcolor=#E9E9E9
| 248165 ||  || — || November 12, 2004 || Socorro || LINEAR || GER || align=right | 3.4 km || 
|-id=166 bgcolor=#E9E9E9
| 248166 ||  || — || December 2, 2004 || Catalina || CSS || — || align=right | 4.8 km || 
|-id=167 bgcolor=#E9E9E9
| 248167 ||  || — || December 3, 2004 || Kitt Peak || Spacewatch || — || align=right | 3.3 km || 
|-id=168 bgcolor=#fefefe
| 248168 ||  || — || December 10, 2004 || Kitt Peak || Spacewatch || — || align=right | 1.2 km || 
|-id=169 bgcolor=#d6d6d6
| 248169 ||  || — || December 11, 2004 || Socorro || LINEAR || — || align=right | 4.4 km || 
|-id=170 bgcolor=#E9E9E9
| 248170 ||  || — || December 12, 2004 || Kitt Peak || Spacewatch || — || align=right | 2.6 km || 
|-id=171 bgcolor=#fefefe
| 248171 ||  || — || December 12, 2004 || Kitt Peak || Spacewatch || — || align=right | 1.1 km || 
|-id=172 bgcolor=#d6d6d6
| 248172 ||  || — || December 2, 2004 || Socorro || LINEAR || EUP || align=right | 7.2 km || 
|-id=173 bgcolor=#d6d6d6
| 248173 ||  || — || December 8, 2004 || Socorro || LINEAR || — || align=right | 3.0 km || 
|-id=174 bgcolor=#fefefe
| 248174 ||  || — || December 11, 2004 || Kitt Peak || Spacewatch || CHL || align=right | 2.9 km || 
|-id=175 bgcolor=#fefefe
| 248175 ||  || — || December 11, 2004 || Kitt Peak || Spacewatch || — || align=right | 1.1 km || 
|-id=176 bgcolor=#E9E9E9
| 248176 ||  || — || December 10, 2004 || Socorro || LINEAR || MRX || align=right | 2.3 km || 
|-id=177 bgcolor=#E9E9E9
| 248177 ||  || — || December 18, 2004 || Mount Lemmon || Mount Lemmon Survey || — || align=right | 4.7 km || 
|-id=178 bgcolor=#fefefe
| 248178 ||  || — || January 6, 2005 || Socorro || LINEAR || FLO || align=right data-sort-value="0.94" | 940 m || 
|-id=179 bgcolor=#fefefe
| 248179 ||  || — || January 6, 2005 || Catalina || CSS || — || align=right | 1.7 km || 
|-id=180 bgcolor=#E9E9E9
| 248180 ||  || — || January 6, 2005 || Catalina || CSS || MIT || align=right | 3.2 km || 
|-id=181 bgcolor=#E9E9E9
| 248181 ||  || — || January 6, 2005 || Socorro || LINEAR || — || align=right | 3.2 km || 
|-id=182 bgcolor=#fefefe
| 248182 ||  || — || January 13, 2005 || Catalina || CSS || — || align=right | 1.3 km || 
|-id=183 bgcolor=#C2FFFF
| 248183 Peisandros ||  ||  || January 13, 2005 || Vicques || M. Ory || L5 || align=right | 12 km || 
|-id=184 bgcolor=#d6d6d6
| 248184 ||  || — || January 15, 2005 || Kitt Peak || Spacewatch || FIR || align=right | 4.7 km || 
|-id=185 bgcolor=#fefefe
| 248185 ||  || — || January 15, 2005 || Kitt Peak || Spacewatch || — || align=right data-sort-value="0.97" | 970 m || 
|-id=186 bgcolor=#C2FFFF
| 248186 ||  || — || January 6, 2005 || Catalina || CSS || L5 || align=right | 21 km || 
|-id=187 bgcolor=#E9E9E9
| 248187 ||  || — || January 16, 2005 || Kitt Peak || Spacewatch || ADE || align=right | 2.5 km || 
|-id=188 bgcolor=#fefefe
| 248188 ||  || — || January 16, 2005 || Kitt Peak || Spacewatch || SUL || align=right | 3.5 km || 
|-id=189 bgcolor=#C2FFFF
| 248189 ||  || — || January 16, 2005 || Kitt Peak || Spacewatch || L5 || align=right | 16 km || 
|-id=190 bgcolor=#fefefe
| 248190 ||  || — || January 16, 2005 || Mauna Kea || C. Veillet || MAS || align=right data-sort-value="0.78" | 780 m || 
|-id=191 bgcolor=#fefefe
| 248191 ||  || — || February 1, 2005 || Kitt Peak || Spacewatch || NYS || align=right | 1.0 km || 
|-id=192 bgcolor=#d6d6d6
| 248192 ||  || — || February 2, 2005 || Kitt Peak || Spacewatch || — || align=right | 2.7 km || 
|-id=193 bgcolor=#d6d6d6
| 248193 ||  || — || February 2, 2005 || Kitt Peak || Spacewatch || — || align=right | 4.0 km || 
|-id=194 bgcolor=#E9E9E9
| 248194 ||  || — || February 4, 2005 || Kitt Peak || Spacewatch || — || align=right | 2.4 km || 
|-id=195 bgcolor=#d6d6d6
| 248195 ||  || — || February 3, 2005 || Socorro || LINEAR || — || align=right | 2.7 km || 
|-id=196 bgcolor=#d6d6d6
| 248196 ||  || — || February 2, 2005 || Kitt Peak || Spacewatch || — || align=right | 3.6 km || 
|-id=197 bgcolor=#d6d6d6
| 248197 ||  || — || February 1, 2005 || Kitt Peak || Spacewatch || — || align=right | 4.2 km || 
|-id=198 bgcolor=#d6d6d6
| 248198 ||  || — || March 2, 2005 || Kitt Peak || Spacewatch || — || align=right | 2.5 km || 
|-id=199 bgcolor=#d6d6d6
| 248199 ||  || — || March 1, 2005 || Kitt Peak || Spacewatch || ALA || align=right | 7.0 km || 
|-id=200 bgcolor=#d6d6d6
| 248200 ||  || — || March 3, 2005 || Catalina || CSS || — || align=right | 3.4 km || 
|}

248201–248300 

|-bgcolor=#d6d6d6
| 248201 ||  || — || March 3, 2005 || Catalina || CSS || — || align=right | 3.9 km || 
|-id=202 bgcolor=#E9E9E9
| 248202 ||  || — || March 4, 2005 || Catalina || CSS || DOR || align=right | 3.4 km || 
|-id=203 bgcolor=#d6d6d6
| 248203 ||  || — || March 8, 2005 || Mayhill || A. Lowe || — || align=right | 2.9 km || 
|-id=204 bgcolor=#d6d6d6
| 248204 ||  || — || March 3, 2005 || Kitt Peak || Spacewatch || — || align=right | 3.8 km || 
|-id=205 bgcolor=#d6d6d6
| 248205 ||  || — || March 3, 2005 || Kitt Peak || Spacewatch || — || align=right | 4.3 km || 
|-id=206 bgcolor=#E9E9E9
| 248206 ||  || — || March 3, 2005 || Catalina || CSS || — || align=right | 2.5 km || 
|-id=207 bgcolor=#E9E9E9
| 248207 ||  || — || March 3, 2005 || Kitt Peak || Spacewatch || — || align=right | 3.8 km || 
|-id=208 bgcolor=#d6d6d6
| 248208 ||  || — || March 4, 2005 || Kitt Peak || Spacewatch || MEL || align=right | 5.4 km || 
|-id=209 bgcolor=#fefefe
| 248209 ||  || — || March 8, 2005 || Kitt Peak || Spacewatch || FLO || align=right | 1.5 km || 
|-id=210 bgcolor=#d6d6d6
| 248210 ||  || — || March 3, 2005 || Catalina || CSS || — || align=right | 3.5 km || 
|-id=211 bgcolor=#E9E9E9
| 248211 ||  || — || March 3, 2005 || Kitt Peak || Spacewatch || — || align=right | 3.2 km || 
|-id=212 bgcolor=#fefefe
| 248212 ||  || — || March 3, 2005 || Kitt Peak || Spacewatch || — || align=right | 2.1 km || 
|-id=213 bgcolor=#d6d6d6
| 248213 ||  || — || March 4, 2005 || Catalina || CSS || VER || align=right | 5.7 km || 
|-id=214 bgcolor=#E9E9E9
| 248214 ||  || — || March 4, 2005 || Mount Lemmon || Mount Lemmon Survey || HOF || align=right | 3.1 km || 
|-id=215 bgcolor=#E9E9E9
| 248215 ||  || — || March 9, 2005 || Jarnac || Jarnac Obs. || — || align=right | 3.7 km || 
|-id=216 bgcolor=#d6d6d6
| 248216 ||  || — || March 9, 2005 || Kitt Peak || Spacewatch || — || align=right | 4.0 km || 
|-id=217 bgcolor=#d6d6d6
| 248217 ||  || — || March 9, 2005 || Mount Lemmon || Mount Lemmon Survey || CRO || align=right | 4.5 km || 
|-id=218 bgcolor=#d6d6d6
| 248218 ||  || — || March 10, 2005 || Mayhill || A. Lowe || — || align=right | 4.3 km || 
|-id=219 bgcolor=#E9E9E9
| 248219 ||  || — || March 7, 2005 || Socorro || LINEAR || — || align=right | 3.4 km || 
|-id=220 bgcolor=#E9E9E9
| 248220 ||  || — || March 8, 2005 || Mount Lemmon || Mount Lemmon Survey || — || align=right | 2.0 km || 
|-id=221 bgcolor=#fefefe
| 248221 ||  || — || March 9, 2005 || Kitt Peak || Spacewatch || — || align=right | 2.3 km || 
|-id=222 bgcolor=#d6d6d6
| 248222 ||  || — || March 11, 2005 || Mount Lemmon || Mount Lemmon Survey || — || align=right | 4.7 km || 
|-id=223 bgcolor=#fefefe
| 248223 ||  || — || March 11, 2005 || Mount Lemmon || Mount Lemmon Survey || — || align=right | 1.3 km || 
|-id=224 bgcolor=#d6d6d6
| 248224 ||  || — || March 12, 2005 || Kitt Peak || Spacewatch || — || align=right | 4.3 km || 
|-id=225 bgcolor=#E9E9E9
| 248225 ||  || — || March 12, 2005 || Kitt Peak || Spacewatch || HOF || align=right | 3.7 km || 
|-id=226 bgcolor=#d6d6d6
| 248226 ||  || — || March 13, 2005 || Catalina || CSS || LUT || align=right | 5.2 km || 
|-id=227 bgcolor=#E9E9E9
| 248227 ||  || — || March 12, 2005 || Socorro || LINEAR || BRU || align=right | 5.9 km || 
|-id=228 bgcolor=#d6d6d6
| 248228 ||  || — || March 4, 2005 || Kitt Peak || Spacewatch || — || align=right | 3.3 km || 
|-id=229 bgcolor=#d6d6d6
| 248229 ||  || — || March 8, 2005 || Anderson Mesa || LONEOS || — || align=right | 5.9 km || 
|-id=230 bgcolor=#E9E9E9
| 248230 ||  || — || March 8, 2005 || Mount Lemmon || Mount Lemmon Survey || — || align=right | 2.2 km || 
|-id=231 bgcolor=#d6d6d6
| 248231 ||  || — || March 9, 2005 || Mount Lemmon || Mount Lemmon Survey || — || align=right | 2.0 km || 
|-id=232 bgcolor=#E9E9E9
| 248232 ||  || — || March 11, 2005 || Mount Lemmon || Mount Lemmon Survey || CLO || align=right | 3.2 km || 
|-id=233 bgcolor=#d6d6d6
| 248233 ||  || — || March 7, 2005 || Socorro || LINEAR || — || align=right | 3.1 km || 
|-id=234 bgcolor=#E9E9E9
| 248234 ||  || — || March 11, 2005 || Kitt Peak || Spacewatch || — || align=right | 1.3 km || 
|-id=235 bgcolor=#E9E9E9
| 248235 ||  || — || March 11, 2005 || Catalina || CSS || — || align=right | 3.6 km || 
|-id=236 bgcolor=#E9E9E9
| 248236 ||  || — || March 12, 2005 || Kitt Peak || Spacewatch || EUN || align=right | 1.2 km || 
|-id=237 bgcolor=#d6d6d6
| 248237 ||  || — || March 12, 2005 || Kitt Peak || Spacewatch || — || align=right | 4.6 km || 
|-id=238 bgcolor=#C2FFFF
| 248238 ||  || — || March 13, 2005 || Mount Lemmon || Mount Lemmon Survey || L5 || align=right | 18 km || 
|-id=239 bgcolor=#E9E9E9
| 248239 ||  || — || March 9, 2005 || Mount Lemmon || Mount Lemmon Survey || — || align=right | 2.6 km || 
|-id=240 bgcolor=#E9E9E9
| 248240 ||  || — || March 10, 2005 || Catalina || CSS || ADE || align=right | 2.8 km || 
|-id=241 bgcolor=#d6d6d6
| 248241 ||  || — || March 11, 2005 || Catalina || CSS || — || align=right | 4.8 km || 
|-id=242 bgcolor=#d6d6d6
| 248242 ||  || — || March 1, 2005 || Catalina || CSS || — || align=right | 4.9 km || 
|-id=243 bgcolor=#E9E9E9
| 248243 ||  || — || March 13, 2005 || Catalina || CSS || DOR || align=right | 3.0 km || 
|-id=244 bgcolor=#E9E9E9
| 248244 ||  || — || March 17, 2005 || Kitt Peak || Spacewatch || — || align=right | 3.2 km || 
|-id=245 bgcolor=#E9E9E9
| 248245 ||  || — || March 30, 2005 || Goodricke-Pigott || P. Kumar || — || align=right | 4.0 km || 
|-id=246 bgcolor=#E9E9E9
| 248246 ||  || — || April 4, 2005 || Vail-Jarnac || Jarnac Obs. || — || align=right | 3.0 km || 
|-id=247 bgcolor=#E9E9E9
| 248247 ||  || — || April 2, 2005 || Kitt Peak || Spacewatch || — || align=right | 1.5 km || 
|-id=248 bgcolor=#d6d6d6
| 248248 ||  || — || April 2, 2005 || Mount Lemmon || Mount Lemmon Survey || — || align=right | 5.3 km || 
|-id=249 bgcolor=#E9E9E9
| 248249 ||  || — || April 2, 2005 || Mount Lemmon || Mount Lemmon Survey || — || align=right | 1.8 km || 
|-id=250 bgcolor=#d6d6d6
| 248250 ||  || — || April 2, 2005 || Mount Lemmon || Mount Lemmon Survey || — || align=right | 5.0 km || 
|-id=251 bgcolor=#E9E9E9
| 248251 ||  || — || April 1, 2005 || Anderson Mesa || LONEOS || — || align=right | 3.1 km || 
|-id=252 bgcolor=#E9E9E9
| 248252 ||  || — || April 1, 2005 || Goodricke-Pigott || V. Reddy || — || align=right | 2.8 km || 
|-id=253 bgcolor=#E9E9E9
| 248253 ||  || — || April 3, 2005 || Palomar || NEAT || — || align=right | 1.3 km || 
|-id=254 bgcolor=#E9E9E9
| 248254 ||  || — || April 2, 2005 || Siding Spring || SSS || — || align=right | 4.7 km || 
|-id=255 bgcolor=#E9E9E9
| 248255 ||  || — || April 5, 2005 || Kitt Peak || Spacewatch || — || align=right | 2.5 km || 
|-id=256 bgcolor=#E9E9E9
| 248256 ||  || — || April 2, 2005 || Anderson Mesa || LONEOS || ADE || align=right | 3.2 km || 
|-id=257 bgcolor=#d6d6d6
| 248257 ||  || — || April 2, 2005 || Mount Lemmon || Mount Lemmon Survey || — || align=right | 3.4 km || 
|-id=258 bgcolor=#d6d6d6
| 248258 ||  || — || April 4, 2005 || Catalina || CSS || HYG || align=right | 4.6 km || 
|-id=259 bgcolor=#d6d6d6
| 248259 ||  || — || April 4, 2005 || Catalina || CSS || — || align=right | 4.5 km || 
|-id=260 bgcolor=#d6d6d6
| 248260 ||  || — || April 6, 2005 || Kitt Peak || Spacewatch || — || align=right | 5.2 km || 
|-id=261 bgcolor=#d6d6d6
| 248261 ||  || — || April 6, 2005 || Kitt Peak || Spacewatch || — || align=right | 5.2 km || 
|-id=262 bgcolor=#d6d6d6
| 248262 Liuxiaobo ||  ||  || April 4, 2005 || Vallemare di Borbona || Vallemare di Borbona Obs. || — || align=right | 3.4 km || 
|-id=263 bgcolor=#d6d6d6
| 248263 ||  || — || April 10, 2005 || Kitt Peak || Spacewatch || VER || align=right | 3.9 km || 
|-id=264 bgcolor=#E9E9E9
| 248264 ||  || — || April 11, 2005 || Kitt Peak || Spacewatch || — || align=right | 2.2 km || 
|-id=265 bgcolor=#d6d6d6
| 248265 ||  || — || April 8, 2005 || Socorro || LINEAR || — || align=right | 4.9 km || 
|-id=266 bgcolor=#E9E9E9
| 248266 ||  || — || April 13, 2005 || Socorro || LINEAR || ADE || align=right | 3.8 km || 
|-id=267 bgcolor=#E9E9E9
| 248267 ||  || — || April 12, 2005 || Anderson Mesa || LONEOS || — || align=right | 3.2 km || 
|-id=268 bgcolor=#d6d6d6
| 248268 ||  || — || April 12, 2005 || Kitt Peak || Spacewatch || URS || align=right | 4.5 km || 
|-id=269 bgcolor=#fefefe
| 248269 ||  || — || April 18, 2005 || Catalina || CSS || — || align=right | 2.8 km || 
|-id=270 bgcolor=#E9E9E9
| 248270 ||  || — || April 30, 2005 || Kitt Peak || Spacewatch || — || align=right | 1.7 km || 
|-id=271 bgcolor=#E9E9E9
| 248271 ||  || — || April 30, 2005 || Siding Spring || SSS || — || align=right | 1.8 km || 
|-id=272 bgcolor=#E9E9E9
| 248272 ||  || — || May 2, 2005 || Kitt Peak || Spacewatch || JUN || align=right | 2.0 km || 
|-id=273 bgcolor=#E9E9E9
| 248273 ||  || — || May 3, 2005 || Kitt Peak || Spacewatch || — || align=right | 2.3 km || 
|-id=274 bgcolor=#E9E9E9
| 248274 ||  || — || May 2, 2005 || Kitt Peak || Spacewatch || ADE || align=right | 2.9 km || 
|-id=275 bgcolor=#E9E9E9
| 248275 ||  || — || May 4, 2005 || Palomar || NEAT || — || align=right | 3.4 km || 
|-id=276 bgcolor=#E9E9E9
| 248276 ||  || — || May 7, 2005 || Mount Lemmon || Mount Lemmon Survey || — || align=right | 1.8 km || 
|-id=277 bgcolor=#E9E9E9
| 248277 ||  || — || May 8, 2005 || Catalina || CSS || — || align=right | 3.4 km || 
|-id=278 bgcolor=#E9E9E9
| 248278 ||  || — || May 4, 2005 || Catalina || CSS || — || align=right | 2.4 km || 
|-id=279 bgcolor=#E9E9E9
| 248279 ||  || — || May 8, 2005 || Kitt Peak || Spacewatch || — || align=right | 1.3 km || 
|-id=280 bgcolor=#E9E9E9
| 248280 ||  || — || May 4, 2005 || Palomar || NEAT || JUN || align=right | 1.7 km || 
|-id=281 bgcolor=#E9E9E9
| 248281 ||  || — || May 8, 2005 || Kitt Peak || Spacewatch || — || align=right | 1.7 km || 
|-id=282 bgcolor=#E9E9E9
| 248282 ||  || — || May 8, 2005 || Socorro || LINEAR || — || align=right | 2.2 km || 
|-id=283 bgcolor=#d6d6d6
| 248283 ||  || — || May 9, 2005 || Mount Lemmon || Mount Lemmon Survey || HYG || align=right | 4.3 km || 
|-id=284 bgcolor=#d6d6d6
| 248284 ||  || — || May 10, 2005 || Kitt Peak || Spacewatch || — || align=right | 3.3 km || 
|-id=285 bgcolor=#E9E9E9
| 248285 ||  || — || May 10, 2005 || Kitt Peak || Spacewatch || JUN || align=right | 1.5 km || 
|-id=286 bgcolor=#E9E9E9
| 248286 ||  || — || May 13, 2005 || Kitt Peak || Spacewatch || — || align=right | 2.6 km || 
|-id=287 bgcolor=#d6d6d6
| 248287 ||  || — || May 11, 2005 || Catalina || CSS || ALA || align=right | 5.5 km || 
|-id=288 bgcolor=#E9E9E9
| 248288 ||  || — || May 13, 2005 || Kitt Peak || Spacewatch || — || align=right | 1.5 km || 
|-id=289 bgcolor=#E9E9E9
| 248289 ||  || — || May 16, 2005 || Mount Lemmon || Mount Lemmon Survey || — || align=right | 2.2 km || 
|-id=290 bgcolor=#E9E9E9
| 248290 ||  || — || May 29, 2005 || Reedy Creek || J. Broughton || — || align=right | 4.5 km || 
|-id=291 bgcolor=#d6d6d6
| 248291 ||  || — || May 30, 2005 || Catalina || CSS || — || align=right | 4.0 km || 
|-id=292 bgcolor=#d6d6d6
| 248292 ||  || — || May 28, 2005 || Reedy Creek || J. Broughton || — || align=right | 3.1 km || 
|-id=293 bgcolor=#d6d6d6
| 248293 ||  || — || June 1, 2005 || Mount Lemmon || Mount Lemmon Survey || — || align=right | 5.6 km || 
|-id=294 bgcolor=#E9E9E9
| 248294 ||  || — || June 2, 2005 || Catalina || CSS || — || align=right | 3.9 km || 
|-id=295 bgcolor=#E9E9E9
| 248295 ||  || — || June 4, 2005 || Reedy Creek || J. Broughton || — || align=right | 2.4 km || 
|-id=296 bgcolor=#d6d6d6
| 248296 ||  || — || June 1, 2005 || Kitt Peak || Spacewatch || — || align=right | 4.8 km || 
|-id=297 bgcolor=#E9E9E9
| 248297 ||  || — || June 5, 2005 || Kitt Peak || Spacewatch || — || align=right | 2.9 km || 
|-id=298 bgcolor=#FA8072
| 248298 ||  || — || June 9, 2005 || Siding Spring || SSS || — || align=right | 1.5 km || 
|-id=299 bgcolor=#d6d6d6
| 248299 ||  || — || June 8, 2005 || Kitt Peak || Spacewatch || — || align=right | 5.4 km || 
|-id=300 bgcolor=#E9E9E9
| 248300 ||  || — || June 10, 2005 || Kitt Peak || Spacewatch || EUN || align=right | 1.6 km || 
|}

248301–248400 

|-bgcolor=#E9E9E9
| 248301 ||  || — || June 8, 2005 || Kitt Peak || Spacewatch || — || align=right | 3.5 km || 
|-id=302 bgcolor=#E9E9E9
| 248302 ||  || — || June 11, 2005 || Kitt Peak || Spacewatch || — || align=right | 1.8 km || 
|-id=303 bgcolor=#E9E9E9
| 248303 ||  || — || June 5, 2005 || Reedy Creek || J. Broughton || — || align=right | 3.6 km || 
|-id=304 bgcolor=#d6d6d6
| 248304 ||  || — || June 17, 2005 || Mount Lemmon || Mount Lemmon Survey || — || align=right | 3.7 km || 
|-id=305 bgcolor=#E9E9E9
| 248305 ||  || — || June 30, 2005 || Kitt Peak || Spacewatch || — || align=right | 2.7 km || 
|-id=306 bgcolor=#E9E9E9
| 248306 ||  || — || June 29, 2005 || Kitt Peak || Spacewatch || — || align=right | 3.1 km || 
|-id=307 bgcolor=#d6d6d6
| 248307 ||  || — || June 30, 2005 || Kitt Peak || Spacewatch || EOS || align=right | 2.5 km || 
|-id=308 bgcolor=#E9E9E9
| 248308 ||  || — || July 4, 2005 || Palomar || NEAT || — || align=right | 3.5 km || 
|-id=309 bgcolor=#d6d6d6
| 248309 ||  || — || July 3, 2005 || Palomar || NEAT || — || align=right | 4.6 km || 
|-id=310 bgcolor=#E9E9E9
| 248310 ||  || — || July 1, 2005 || Kitt Peak || Spacewatch || — || align=right | 3.5 km || 
|-id=311 bgcolor=#d6d6d6
| 248311 ||  || — || July 5, 2005 || Palomar || NEAT || — || align=right | 2.7 km || 
|-id=312 bgcolor=#E9E9E9
| 248312 ||  || — || July 6, 2005 || Kitt Peak || Spacewatch || — || align=right | 2.8 km || 
|-id=313 bgcolor=#E9E9E9
| 248313 ||  || — || July 9, 2005 || Kitt Peak || Spacewatch || PAL || align=right | 2.5 km || 
|-id=314 bgcolor=#E9E9E9
| 248314 ||  || — || July 3, 2005 || Palomar || NEAT || — || align=right | 2.0 km || 
|-id=315 bgcolor=#d6d6d6
| 248315 ||  || — || July 19, 2005 || Palomar || NEAT || EUP || align=right | 6.1 km || 
|-id=316 bgcolor=#E9E9E9
| 248316 ||  || — || July 27, 2005 || Palomar || NEAT || — || align=right | 2.8 km || 
|-id=317 bgcolor=#d6d6d6
| 248317 ||  || — || July 31, 2005 || Palomar || NEAT || EOS || align=right | 4.1 km || 
|-id=318 bgcolor=#E9E9E9
| 248318 ||  || — || August 2, 2005 || Socorro || LINEAR || — || align=right | 1.8 km || 
|-id=319 bgcolor=#d6d6d6
| 248319 ||  || — || August 7, 2005 || Reedy Creek || J. Broughton || TRP || align=right | 4.0 km || 
|-id=320 bgcolor=#d6d6d6
| 248320 ||  || — || August 4, 2005 || Palomar || NEAT || — || align=right | 3.3 km || 
|-id=321 bgcolor=#E9E9E9
| 248321 Cester ||  ||  || August 14, 2005 || Vallemare di Borbona || V. S. Casulli || — || align=right | 1.7 km || 
|-id=322 bgcolor=#d6d6d6
| 248322 ||  || — || August 6, 2005 || Siding Spring || SSS || — || align=right | 4.7 km || 
|-id=323 bgcolor=#E9E9E9
| 248323 ||  || — || August 23, 2005 || Haleakala || NEAT || — || align=right | 1.9 km || 
|-id=324 bgcolor=#d6d6d6
| 248324 ||  || — || August 24, 2005 || Palomar || NEAT || URS || align=right | 6.0 km || 
|-id=325 bgcolor=#d6d6d6
| 248325 ||  || — || August 24, 2005 || Palomar || NEAT || EOS || align=right | 3.2 km || 
|-id=326 bgcolor=#E9E9E9
| 248326 ||  || — || August 24, 2005 || Palomar || NEAT || HOF || align=right | 4.3 km || 
|-id=327 bgcolor=#d6d6d6
| 248327 ||  || — || August 24, 2005 || Palomar || NEAT || — || align=right | 3.2 km || 
|-id=328 bgcolor=#d6d6d6
| 248328 ||  || — || August 25, 2005 || Palomar || NEAT || THM || align=right | 3.2 km || 
|-id=329 bgcolor=#d6d6d6
| 248329 ||  || — || August 22, 2005 || Haleakala || NEAT || DUR || align=right | 4.1 km || 
|-id=330 bgcolor=#d6d6d6
| 248330 ||  || — || August 25, 2005 || Palomar || NEAT || — || align=right | 3.4 km || 
|-id=331 bgcolor=#d6d6d6
| 248331 ||  || — || August 25, 2005 || Campo Imperatore || CINEOS || EUP || align=right | 6.0 km || 
|-id=332 bgcolor=#d6d6d6
| 248332 ||  || — || August 26, 2005 || Anderson Mesa || LONEOS || — || align=right | 4.6 km || 
|-id=333 bgcolor=#d6d6d6
| 248333 ||  || — || August 26, 2005 || Palomar || NEAT || — || align=right | 3.1 km || 
|-id=334 bgcolor=#E9E9E9
| 248334 ||  || — || August 28, 2005 || Kitt Peak || Spacewatch || — || align=right | 3.9 km || 
|-id=335 bgcolor=#d6d6d6
| 248335 ||  || — || August 25, 2005 || Palomar || NEAT || EOS || align=right | 2.6 km || 
|-id=336 bgcolor=#E9E9E9
| 248336 ||  || — || August 28, 2005 || Siding Spring || SSS || — || align=right | 3.3 km || 
|-id=337 bgcolor=#fefefe
| 248337 ||  || — || August 29, 2005 || Socorro || LINEAR || H || align=right data-sort-value="0.93" | 930 m || 
|-id=338 bgcolor=#d6d6d6
| 248338 ||  || — || August 29, 2005 || Anderson Mesa || LONEOS || — || align=right | 6.1 km || 
|-id=339 bgcolor=#d6d6d6
| 248339 ||  || — || August 29, 2005 || Anderson Mesa || LONEOS || — || align=right | 3.1 km || 
|-id=340 bgcolor=#E9E9E9
| 248340 ||  || — || August 29, 2005 || Anderson Mesa || LONEOS || HOF || align=right | 4.5 km || 
|-id=341 bgcolor=#d6d6d6
| 248341 ||  || — || August 30, 2005 || Socorro || LINEAR || EUP || align=right | 4.7 km || 
|-id=342 bgcolor=#E9E9E9
| 248342 ||  || — || August 29, 2005 || Bergisch Gladbac || W. Bickel || HOF || align=right | 3.7 km || 
|-id=343 bgcolor=#E9E9E9
| 248343 ||  || — || August 26, 2005 || Palomar || NEAT || — || align=right | 3.9 km || 
|-id=344 bgcolor=#d6d6d6
| 248344 ||  || — || August 27, 2005 || Palomar || NEAT || — || align=right | 4.2 km || 
|-id=345 bgcolor=#d6d6d6
| 248345 ||  || — || August 27, 2005 || Palomar || NEAT || EOS || align=right | 3.6 km || 
|-id=346 bgcolor=#E9E9E9
| 248346 ||  || — || August 27, 2005 || Palomar || NEAT || HOF || align=right | 3.0 km || 
|-id=347 bgcolor=#E9E9E9
| 248347 ||  || — || August 27, 2005 || Palomar || NEAT || NEM || align=right | 3.5 km || 
|-id=348 bgcolor=#d6d6d6
| 248348 ||  || — || August 27, 2005 || Palomar || NEAT || — || align=right | 4.9 km || 
|-id=349 bgcolor=#d6d6d6
| 248349 ||  || — || August 28, 2005 || Kitt Peak || Spacewatch || — || align=right | 2.7 km || 
|-id=350 bgcolor=#d6d6d6
| 248350 ||  || — || August 28, 2005 || Kitt Peak || Spacewatch || — || align=right | 3.4 km || 
|-id=351 bgcolor=#d6d6d6
| 248351 ||  || — || August 28, 2005 || Kitt Peak || Spacewatch || VER || align=right | 3.9 km || 
|-id=352 bgcolor=#d6d6d6
| 248352 ||  || — || August 28, 2005 || Kitt Peak || Spacewatch || — || align=right | 5.3 km || 
|-id=353 bgcolor=#d6d6d6
| 248353 ||  || — || August 28, 2005 || Kitt Peak || Spacewatch || — || align=right | 4.7 km || 
|-id=354 bgcolor=#d6d6d6
| 248354 ||  || — || August 28, 2005 || Kitt Peak || Spacewatch || — || align=right | 2.3 km || 
|-id=355 bgcolor=#d6d6d6
| 248355 ||  || — || August 30, 2005 || Socorro || LINEAR || — || align=right | 6.0 km || 
|-id=356 bgcolor=#d6d6d6
| 248356 ||  || — || August 31, 2005 || Anderson Mesa || LONEOS || LIX || align=right | 5.2 km || 
|-id=357 bgcolor=#E9E9E9
| 248357 ||  || — || August 28, 2005 || Anderson Mesa || LONEOS || — || align=right | 3.8 km || 
|-id=358 bgcolor=#E9E9E9
| 248358 ||  || — || August 28, 2005 || Siding Spring || SSS || — || align=right | 2.7 km || 
|-id=359 bgcolor=#E9E9E9
| 248359 ||  || — || August 28, 2005 || Siding Spring || SSS || — || align=right | 3.6 km || 
|-id=360 bgcolor=#d6d6d6
| 248360 ||  || — || August 26, 2005 || Palomar || NEAT || — || align=right | 3.9 km || 
|-id=361 bgcolor=#d6d6d6
| 248361 ||  || — || August 28, 2005 || Kitt Peak || Spacewatch || — || align=right | 4.3 km || 
|-id=362 bgcolor=#d6d6d6
| 248362 ||  || — || August 28, 2005 || Siding Spring || SSS || — || align=right | 2.9 km || 
|-id=363 bgcolor=#d6d6d6
| 248363 ||  || — || August 31, 2005 || Palomar || NEAT || EUP || align=right | 5.4 km || 
|-id=364 bgcolor=#d6d6d6
| 248364 ||  || — || August 26, 2005 || Campo Imperatore || CINEOS || ALA || align=right | 6.2 km || 
|-id=365 bgcolor=#E9E9E9
| 248365 ||  || — || August 29, 2005 || Palomar || NEAT || DOR || align=right | 4.3 km || 
|-id=366 bgcolor=#d6d6d6
| 248366 ||  || — || August 29, 2005 || Palomar || NEAT || — || align=right | 3.8 km || 
|-id=367 bgcolor=#d6d6d6
| 248367 ||  || — || August 29, 2005 || Palomar || NEAT || — || align=right | 5.8 km || 
|-id=368 bgcolor=#d6d6d6
| 248368 ||  || — || August 29, 2005 || Palomar || NEAT || — || align=right | 3.8 km || 
|-id=369 bgcolor=#d6d6d6
| 248369 ||  || — || August 29, 2005 || Palomar || NEAT || VER || align=right | 3.6 km || 
|-id=370 bgcolor=#d6d6d6
| 248370 ||  || — || August 29, 2005 || Palomar || NEAT ||  || align=right | 3.6 km || 
|-id=371 bgcolor=#d6d6d6
| 248371 ||  || — || August 26, 2005 || Palomar || NEAT || EOS || align=right | 4.9 km || 
|-id=372 bgcolor=#E9E9E9
| 248372 ||  || — || August 24, 2005 || Palomar || NEAT || — || align=right | 3.4 km || 
|-id=373 bgcolor=#d6d6d6
| 248373 ||  || — || September 8, 2005 || Socorro || LINEAR || — || align=right | 5.2 km || 
|-id=374 bgcolor=#d6d6d6
| 248374 ||  || — || September 10, 2005 || Anderson Mesa || LONEOS || — || align=right | 4.0 km || 
|-id=375 bgcolor=#d6d6d6
| 248375 ||  || — || September 1, 2005 || Kitt Peak || Spacewatch || — || align=right | 3.2 km || 
|-id=376 bgcolor=#d6d6d6
| 248376 ||  || — || September 1, 2005 || Palomar || NEAT || — || align=right | 6.3 km || 
|-id=377 bgcolor=#d6d6d6
| 248377 ||  || — || September 9, 2005 || Socorro || LINEAR || — || align=right | 5.1 km || 
|-id=378 bgcolor=#d6d6d6
| 248378 ||  || — || September 10, 2005 || Anderson Mesa || LONEOS || — || align=right | 3.9 km || 
|-id=379 bgcolor=#d6d6d6
| 248379 ||  || — || September 10, 2005 || Anderson Mesa || LONEOS || — || align=right | 2.9 km || 
|-id=380 bgcolor=#d6d6d6
| 248380 ||  || — || September 11, 2005 || Anderson Mesa || LONEOS || — || align=right | 6.1 km || 
|-id=381 bgcolor=#fefefe
| 248381 ||  || — || September 23, 2005 || Hormersdorf || J. Lorenz || FLO || align=right | 2.4 km || 
|-id=382 bgcolor=#d6d6d6
| 248382 ||  || — || September 23, 2005 || Kitt Peak || Spacewatch || — || align=right | 4.9 km || 
|-id=383 bgcolor=#d6d6d6
| 248383 ||  || — || September 26, 2005 || Socorro || LINEAR || EUP || align=right | 7.5 km || 
|-id=384 bgcolor=#d6d6d6
| 248384 ||  || — || September 23, 2005 || Kitt Peak || Spacewatch || THM || align=right | 3.3 km || 
|-id=385 bgcolor=#d6d6d6
| 248385 ||  || — || September 24, 2005 || Anderson Mesa || LONEOS || EUP || align=right | 6.2 km || 
|-id=386 bgcolor=#d6d6d6
| 248386 ||  || — || September 24, 2005 || Anderson Mesa || LONEOS || — || align=right | 6.5 km || 
|-id=387 bgcolor=#d6d6d6
| 248387 ||  || — || September 26, 2005 || Palomar || NEAT || LIX || align=right | 4.7 km || 
|-id=388 bgcolor=#d6d6d6
| 248388 Namtso ||  ||  || September 26, 2005 || Vallemare Borbon || V. S. Casulli || — || align=right | 3.2 km || 
|-id=389 bgcolor=#d6d6d6
| 248389 ||  || — || September 23, 2005 || Cordell-Lorenz || D. T. Durig || EOS || align=right | 3.1 km || 
|-id=390 bgcolor=#d6d6d6
| 248390 ||  || — || September 23, 2005 || Catalina || CSS || — || align=right | 3.5 km || 
|-id=391 bgcolor=#d6d6d6
| 248391 ||  || — || September 23, 2005 || Catalina || CSS || — || align=right | 5.2 km || 
|-id=392 bgcolor=#d6d6d6
| 248392 ||  || — || September 23, 2005 || Kitt Peak || Spacewatch || — || align=right | 5.6 km || 
|-id=393 bgcolor=#d6d6d6
| 248393 ||  || — || September 24, 2005 || Kitt Peak || Spacewatch || HYG || align=right | 3.2 km || 
|-id=394 bgcolor=#d6d6d6
| 248394 ||  || — || September 24, 2005 || Kitt Peak || Spacewatch || — || align=right | 4.8 km || 
|-id=395 bgcolor=#d6d6d6
| 248395 ||  || — || September 24, 2005 || Kitt Peak || Spacewatch || — || align=right | 4.5 km || 
|-id=396 bgcolor=#d6d6d6
| 248396 ||  || — || September 26, 2005 || Palomar || NEAT || — || align=right | 3.5 km || 
|-id=397 bgcolor=#d6d6d6
| 248397 ||  || — || September 26, 2005 || Palomar || NEAT || — || align=right | 3.2 km || 
|-id=398 bgcolor=#d6d6d6
| 248398 ||  || — || September 27, 2005 || Palomar || NEAT || — || align=right | 3.3 km || 
|-id=399 bgcolor=#d6d6d6
| 248399 ||  || — || September 23, 2005 || Catalina || CSS || LIX || align=right | 4.2 km || 
|-id=400 bgcolor=#d6d6d6
| 248400 ||  || — || September 23, 2005 || Catalina || CSS || — || align=right | 3.3 km || 
|}

248401–248500 

|-bgcolor=#d6d6d6
| 248401 ||  || — || September 24, 2005 || Kitt Peak || Spacewatch || HYG || align=right | 4.1 km || 
|-id=402 bgcolor=#d6d6d6
| 248402 ||  || — || September 25, 2005 || Kitt Peak || Spacewatch || THM || align=right | 4.3 km || 
|-id=403 bgcolor=#d6d6d6
| 248403 ||  || — || September 25, 2005 || Kitt Peak || Spacewatch || HYG || align=right | 5.4 km || 
|-id=404 bgcolor=#d6d6d6
| 248404 ||  || — || September 25, 2005 || Kitt Peak || Spacewatch || HYG || align=right | 3.1 km || 
|-id=405 bgcolor=#d6d6d6
| 248405 ||  || — || September 25, 2005 || Palomar || NEAT || HYG || align=right | 3.2 km || 
|-id=406 bgcolor=#d6d6d6
| 248406 ||  || — || September 25, 2005 || Kitt Peak || Spacewatch || — || align=right | 3.6 km || 
|-id=407 bgcolor=#d6d6d6
| 248407 ||  || — || September 28, 2005 || Palomar || NEAT || — || align=right | 2.9 km || 
|-id=408 bgcolor=#d6d6d6
| 248408 ||  || — || September 29, 2005 || Kitt Peak || Spacewatch || — || align=right | 2.3 km || 
|-id=409 bgcolor=#d6d6d6
| 248409 ||  || — || September 25, 2005 || Kitt Peak || Spacewatch || HYG || align=right | 3.8 km || 
|-id=410 bgcolor=#fefefe
| 248410 ||  || — || September 25, 2005 || Kitt Peak || Spacewatch || — || align=right | 1.0 km || 
|-id=411 bgcolor=#d6d6d6
| 248411 ||  || — || September 26, 2005 || Palomar || NEAT || — || align=right | 6.2 km || 
|-id=412 bgcolor=#d6d6d6
| 248412 ||  || — || September 28, 2005 || Palomar || NEAT || FIR || align=right | 4.5 km || 
|-id=413 bgcolor=#fefefe
| 248413 ||  || — || September 29, 2005 || Kitt Peak || Spacewatch || — || align=right | 1.8 km || 
|-id=414 bgcolor=#d6d6d6
| 248414 ||  || — || September 29, 2005 || Kitt Peak || Spacewatch || FIR || align=right | 4.9 km || 
|-id=415 bgcolor=#d6d6d6
| 248415 ||  || — || September 29, 2005 || Mount Lemmon || Mount Lemmon Survey || — || align=right | 3.9 km || 
|-id=416 bgcolor=#d6d6d6
| 248416 ||  || — || September 29, 2005 || Anderson Mesa || LONEOS || HYG || align=right | 3.3 km || 
|-id=417 bgcolor=#d6d6d6
| 248417 ||  || — || September 30, 2005 || Mount Lemmon || Mount Lemmon Survey || — || align=right | 3.9 km || 
|-id=418 bgcolor=#d6d6d6
| 248418 ||  || — || September 30, 2005 || Anderson Mesa || LONEOS || — || align=right | 3.1 km || 
|-id=419 bgcolor=#d6d6d6
| 248419 ||  || — || September 30, 2005 || Palomar || NEAT || — || align=right | 6.1 km || 
|-id=420 bgcolor=#d6d6d6
| 248420 ||  || — || September 30, 2005 || Anderson Mesa || LONEOS || — || align=right | 5.2 km || 
|-id=421 bgcolor=#d6d6d6
| 248421 ||  || — || September 30, 2005 || Catalina || CSS || — || align=right | 5.2 km || 
|-id=422 bgcolor=#d6d6d6
| 248422 ||  || — || September 30, 2005 || Palomar || NEAT || — || align=right | 2.4 km || 
|-id=423 bgcolor=#d6d6d6
| 248423 ||  || — || September 30, 2005 || Palomar || NEAT || — || align=right | 4.7 km || 
|-id=424 bgcolor=#d6d6d6
| 248424 ||  || — || September 29, 2005 || Catalina || CSS || JLI || align=right | 5.5 km || 
|-id=425 bgcolor=#d6d6d6
| 248425 ||  || — || September 22, 2005 || Palomar || NEAT || URS || align=right | 5.4 km || 
|-id=426 bgcolor=#d6d6d6
| 248426 ||  || — || September 18, 2005 || Palomar || NEAT || EOS || align=right | 3.3 km || 
|-id=427 bgcolor=#d6d6d6
| 248427 ||  || — || September 24, 2005 || Kitt Peak || Spacewatch || LUT || align=right | 6.7 km || 
|-id=428 bgcolor=#d6d6d6
| 248428 ||  || — || September 26, 2005 || Catalina || CSS || — || align=right | 3.8 km || 
|-id=429 bgcolor=#d6d6d6
| 248429 ||  || — || September 29, 2005 || Catalina || CSS || URS || align=right | 3.9 km || 
|-id=430 bgcolor=#d6d6d6
| 248430 ||  || — || September 25, 2005 || Apache Point || A. C. Becker || HIL3:2 || align=right | 5.6 km || 
|-id=431 bgcolor=#d6d6d6
| 248431 ||  || — || October 1, 2005 || Mount Lemmon || Mount Lemmon Survey || — || align=right | 4.3 km || 
|-id=432 bgcolor=#d6d6d6
| 248432 ||  || — || October 1, 2005 || Catalina || CSS || EOS || align=right | 2.9 km || 
|-id=433 bgcolor=#d6d6d6
| 248433 ||  || — || October 2, 2005 || Palomar || NEAT || VER || align=right | 3.9 km || 
|-id=434 bgcolor=#d6d6d6
| 248434 ||  || — || October 2, 2005 || Palomar || NEAT || — || align=right | 4.4 km || 
|-id=435 bgcolor=#d6d6d6
| 248435 ||  || — || October 1, 2005 || Catalina || CSS || — || align=right | 3.6 km || 
|-id=436 bgcolor=#d6d6d6
| 248436 ||  || — || October 1, 2005 || Socorro || LINEAR || EUP || align=right | 6.1 km || 
|-id=437 bgcolor=#d6d6d6
| 248437 ||  || — || October 1, 2005 || Mount Lemmon || Mount Lemmon Survey || — || align=right | 4.7 km || 
|-id=438 bgcolor=#d6d6d6
| 248438 ||  || — || October 1, 2005 || Socorro || LINEAR || — || align=right | 4.2 km || 
|-id=439 bgcolor=#d6d6d6
| 248439 ||  || — || October 1, 2005 || Mount Lemmon || Mount Lemmon Survey || HYG || align=right | 5.6 km || 
|-id=440 bgcolor=#d6d6d6
| 248440 ||  || — || October 12, 2005 || Bergisch Gladbac || W. Bickel || — || align=right | 4.0 km || 
|-id=441 bgcolor=#E9E9E9
| 248441 ||  || — || October 5, 2005 || Socorro || LINEAR || AST || align=right | 3.1 km || 
|-id=442 bgcolor=#d6d6d6
| 248442 ||  || — || October 1, 2005 || Mount Lemmon || Mount Lemmon Survey || HYG || align=right | 3.0 km || 
|-id=443 bgcolor=#d6d6d6
| 248443 ||  || — || October 3, 2005 || Catalina || CSS || HYG || align=right | 3.8 km || 
|-id=444 bgcolor=#d6d6d6
| 248444 ||  || — || October 5, 2005 || Catalina || CSS || — || align=right | 5.3 km || 
|-id=445 bgcolor=#d6d6d6
| 248445 ||  || — || October 5, 2005 || Catalina || CSS || — || align=right | 2.5 km || 
|-id=446 bgcolor=#d6d6d6
| 248446 ||  || — || October 5, 2005 || Catalina || CSS || — || align=right | 4.1 km || 
|-id=447 bgcolor=#d6d6d6
| 248447 ||  || — || October 8, 2005 || Socorro || LINEAR || — || align=right | 5.2 km || 
|-id=448 bgcolor=#d6d6d6
| 248448 ||  || — || October 8, 2005 || Catalina || CSS || — || align=right | 4.9 km || 
|-id=449 bgcolor=#d6d6d6
| 248449 ||  || — || October 7, 2005 || Kitt Peak || Spacewatch || — || align=right | 3.3 km || 
|-id=450 bgcolor=#d6d6d6
| 248450 ||  || — || October 8, 2005 || Catalina || CSS || — || align=right | 4.7 km || 
|-id=451 bgcolor=#d6d6d6
| 248451 ||  || — || October 11, 2005 || Kitt Peak || Spacewatch || URS || align=right | 7.0 km || 
|-id=452 bgcolor=#fefefe
| 248452 ||  || — || October 9, 2005 || Kitt Peak || Spacewatch || ERI || align=right | 2.4 km || 
|-id=453 bgcolor=#d6d6d6
| 248453 ||  || — || October 13, 2005 || Socorro || LINEAR || — || align=right | 4.8 km || 
|-id=454 bgcolor=#d6d6d6
| 248454 ||  || — || October 4, 2005 || Palomar || NEAT || — || align=right | 6.0 km || 
|-id=455 bgcolor=#d6d6d6
| 248455 ||  || — || October 14, 2005 || Anderson Mesa || LONEOS || — || align=right | 4.8 km || 
|-id=456 bgcolor=#d6d6d6
| 248456 ||  || — || October 5, 2005 || Catalina || CSS || — || align=right | 5.5 km || 
|-id=457 bgcolor=#d6d6d6
| 248457 ||  || — || October 21, 2005 || Palomar || NEAT || ALA || align=right | 4.0 km || 
|-id=458 bgcolor=#d6d6d6
| 248458 ||  || — || October 23, 2005 || Catalina || CSS || — || align=right | 3.7 km || 
|-id=459 bgcolor=#d6d6d6
| 248459 ||  || — || October 24, 2005 || Kitt Peak || Spacewatch || — || align=right | 2.9 km || 
|-id=460 bgcolor=#d6d6d6
| 248460 ||  || — || October 24, 2005 || Kitt Peak || Spacewatch || EOS || align=right | 3.1 km || 
|-id=461 bgcolor=#d6d6d6
| 248461 ||  || — || October 23, 2005 || Catalina || CSS || — || align=right | 5.2 km || 
|-id=462 bgcolor=#d6d6d6
| 248462 ||  || — || October 23, 2005 || Catalina || CSS || — || align=right | 5.3 km || 
|-id=463 bgcolor=#d6d6d6
| 248463 ||  || — || October 23, 2005 || Catalina || CSS || EOS || align=right | 3.0 km || 
|-id=464 bgcolor=#d6d6d6
| 248464 ||  || — || October 22, 2005 || Kitt Peak || Spacewatch || — || align=right | 3.2 km || 
|-id=465 bgcolor=#d6d6d6
| 248465 ||  || — || October 23, 2005 || Catalina || CSS || — || align=right | 5.2 km || 
|-id=466 bgcolor=#d6d6d6
| 248466 ||  || — || October 23, 2005 || Catalina || CSS || — || align=right | 5.3 km || 
|-id=467 bgcolor=#d6d6d6
| 248467 ||  || — || October 23, 2005 || Catalina || CSS || — || align=right | 5.5 km || 
|-id=468 bgcolor=#d6d6d6
| 248468 ||  || — || October 24, 2005 || Palomar || NEAT || — || align=right | 7.4 km || 
|-id=469 bgcolor=#d6d6d6
| 248469 ||  || — || October 25, 2005 || Catalina || CSS || — || align=right | 4.7 km || 
|-id=470 bgcolor=#d6d6d6
| 248470 ||  || — || October 20, 2005 || Palomar || NEAT || — || align=right | 3.3 km || 
|-id=471 bgcolor=#d6d6d6
| 248471 ||  || — || October 20, 2005 || Palomar || NEAT || — || align=right | 5.4 km || 
|-id=472 bgcolor=#d6d6d6
| 248472 ||  || — || October 22, 2005 || Kitt Peak || Spacewatch || — || align=right | 3.6 km || 
|-id=473 bgcolor=#d6d6d6
| 248473 ||  || — || October 22, 2005 || Kitt Peak || Spacewatch || — || align=right | 3.4 km || 
|-id=474 bgcolor=#d6d6d6
| 248474 ||  || — || October 22, 2005 || Kitt Peak || Spacewatch || — || align=right | 3.8 km || 
|-id=475 bgcolor=#E9E9E9
| 248475 ||  || — || October 22, 2005 || Kitt Peak || Spacewatch || — || align=right | 2.9 km || 
|-id=476 bgcolor=#d6d6d6
| 248476 ||  || — || October 22, 2005 || Kitt Peak || Spacewatch || TIR || align=right | 2.3 km || 
|-id=477 bgcolor=#d6d6d6
| 248477 ||  || — || October 24, 2005 || Kitt Peak || Spacewatch || EUP || align=right | 5.4 km || 
|-id=478 bgcolor=#d6d6d6
| 248478 ||  || — || October 24, 2005 || Kitt Peak || Spacewatch || THM || align=right | 4.0 km || 
|-id=479 bgcolor=#d6d6d6
| 248479 ||  || — || October 21, 2005 || Palomar || NEAT || — || align=right | 4.5 km || 
|-id=480 bgcolor=#d6d6d6
| 248480 ||  || — || October 24, 2005 || Kitt Peak || Spacewatch || FIR || align=right | 5.5 km || 
|-id=481 bgcolor=#d6d6d6
| 248481 ||  || — || October 27, 2005 || Kitt Peak || Spacewatch || — || align=right | 2.8 km || 
|-id=482 bgcolor=#d6d6d6
| 248482 ||  || — || October 27, 2005 || Palomar || NEAT || — || align=right | 4.6 km || 
|-id=483 bgcolor=#d6d6d6
| 248483 ||  || — || October 25, 2005 || Kitt Peak || Spacewatch || TEL || align=right | 5.1 km || 
|-id=484 bgcolor=#d6d6d6
| 248484 ||  || — || October 25, 2005 || Kitt Peak || Spacewatch || SYL7:4 || align=right | 6.5 km || 
|-id=485 bgcolor=#d6d6d6
| 248485 ||  || — || October 25, 2005 || Kitt Peak || Spacewatch || 7:4 || align=right | 5.0 km || 
|-id=486 bgcolor=#d6d6d6
| 248486 ||  || — || October 26, 2005 || Kitt Peak || Spacewatch || — || align=right | 3.5 km || 
|-id=487 bgcolor=#d6d6d6
| 248487 ||  || — || October 28, 2005 || Kitt Peak || Spacewatch || — || align=right | 5.1 km || 
|-id=488 bgcolor=#fefefe
| 248488 ||  || — || October 26, 2005 || Kitt Peak || Spacewatch || FLO || align=right | 2.0 km || 
|-id=489 bgcolor=#d6d6d6
| 248489 ||  || — || October 26, 2005 || Kitt Peak || Spacewatch || — || align=right | 2.9 km || 
|-id=490 bgcolor=#d6d6d6
| 248490 ||  || — || October 27, 2005 || Mount Lemmon || Mount Lemmon Survey || — || align=right | 3.3 km || 
|-id=491 bgcolor=#d6d6d6
| 248491 ||  || — || October 25, 2005 || Catalina || CSS || ALA || align=right | 6.3 km || 
|-id=492 bgcolor=#d6d6d6
| 248492 ||  || — || October 28, 2005 || Catalina || CSS || EUP || align=right | 5.4 km || 
|-id=493 bgcolor=#d6d6d6
| 248493 ||  || — || October 29, 2005 || Catalina || CSS || EOS || align=right | 4.0 km || 
|-id=494 bgcolor=#d6d6d6
| 248494 ||  || — || October 25, 2005 || Kitt Peak || Spacewatch || — || align=right | 5.7 km || 
|-id=495 bgcolor=#d6d6d6
| 248495 ||  || — || October 25, 2005 || Kitt Peak || Spacewatch || DUR || align=right | 5.2 km || 
|-id=496 bgcolor=#d6d6d6
| 248496 ||  || — || October 27, 2005 || Kitt Peak || Spacewatch || — || align=right | 3.9 km || 
|-id=497 bgcolor=#d6d6d6
| 248497 ||  || — || October 27, 2005 || Catalina || CSS || — || align=right | 5.0 km || 
|-id=498 bgcolor=#fefefe
| 248498 ||  || — || October 25, 2005 || Anderson Mesa || LONEOS || — || align=right | 1.6 km || 
|-id=499 bgcolor=#d6d6d6
| 248499 ||  || — || October 31, 2005 || Catalina || CSS || — || align=right | 4.8 km || 
|-id=500 bgcolor=#d6d6d6
| 248500 ||  || — || October 30, 2005 || Socorro || LINEAR || — || align=right | 4.9 km || 
|}

248501–248600 

|-bgcolor=#d6d6d6
| 248501 ||  || — || October 28, 2005 || Catalina || CSS || — || align=right | 4.6 km || 
|-id=502 bgcolor=#d6d6d6
| 248502 ||  || — || October 31, 2005 || Catalina || CSS || — || align=right | 5.9 km || 
|-id=503 bgcolor=#d6d6d6
| 248503 ||  || — || October 23, 2005 || Catalina || CSS || slow || align=right | 5.2 km || 
|-id=504 bgcolor=#d6d6d6
| 248504 ||  || — || October 30, 2005 || Catalina || CSS || — || align=right | 5.6 km || 
|-id=505 bgcolor=#d6d6d6
| 248505 ||  || — || October 22, 2005 || Palomar || NEAT || THM || align=right | 5.1 km || 
|-id=506 bgcolor=#d6d6d6
| 248506 ||  || — || October 24, 2005 || Palomar || NEAT || MEL || align=right | 3.6 km || 
|-id=507 bgcolor=#d6d6d6
| 248507 ||  || — || October 26, 2005 || Palomar || NEAT || — || align=right | 2.9 km || 
|-id=508 bgcolor=#E9E9E9
| 248508 ||  || — || October 24, 2005 || Mauna Kea || D. J. Tholen || — || align=right | 1.9 km || 
|-id=509 bgcolor=#d6d6d6
| 248509 ||  || — || October 20, 2005 || Apache Point || A. C. Becker || — || align=right | 3.0 km || 
|-id=510 bgcolor=#d6d6d6
| 248510 ||  || — || October 26, 2005 || Apache Point || A. C. Becker || — || align=right | 3.6 km || 
|-id=511 bgcolor=#d6d6d6
| 248511 ||  || — || November 3, 2005 || Socorro || LINEAR || — || align=right | 5.9 km || 
|-id=512 bgcolor=#d6d6d6
| 248512 ||  || — || November 4, 2005 || Socorro || LINEAR || — || align=right | 3.7 km || 
|-id=513 bgcolor=#d6d6d6
| 248513 ||  || — || November 3, 2005 || Mount Lemmon || Mount Lemmon Survey || — || align=right | 3.8 km || 
|-id=514 bgcolor=#fefefe
| 248514 ||  || — || November 4, 2005 || Anderson Mesa || LONEOS || PHO || align=right | 1.8 km || 
|-id=515 bgcolor=#d6d6d6
| 248515 ||  || — || November 6, 2005 || Socorro || LINEAR || — || align=right | 5.4 km || 
|-id=516 bgcolor=#E9E9E9
| 248516 ||  || — || November 3, 2005 || Kitt Peak || Spacewatch || — || align=right | 2.0 km || 
|-id=517 bgcolor=#E9E9E9
| 248517 ||  || — || November 12, 2005 || Catalina || CSS || — || align=right | 1.8 km || 
|-id=518 bgcolor=#d6d6d6
| 248518 ||  || — || November 21, 2005 || Kitt Peak || Spacewatch || — || align=right | 3.2 km || 
|-id=519 bgcolor=#d6d6d6
| 248519 ||  || — || November 22, 2005 || Kitt Peak || Spacewatch || — || align=right | 3.2 km || 
|-id=520 bgcolor=#d6d6d6
| 248520 ||  || — || November 21, 2005 || Kitt Peak || Spacewatch || EMA || align=right | 4.6 km || 
|-id=521 bgcolor=#FA8072
| 248521 ||  || — || November 21, 2005 || Catalina || CSS || H || align=right | 1.2 km || 
|-id=522 bgcolor=#d6d6d6
| 248522 ||  || — || November 25, 2005 || Palomar || NEAT || — || align=right | 4.4 km || 
|-id=523 bgcolor=#d6d6d6
| 248523 ||  || — || November 28, 2005 || Mount Lemmon || Mount Lemmon Survey || THM || align=right | 3.0 km || 
|-id=524 bgcolor=#d6d6d6
| 248524 ||  || — || November 26, 2005 || Kitt Peak || Spacewatch || — || align=right | 5.6 km || 
|-id=525 bgcolor=#d6d6d6
| 248525 ||  || — || November 29, 2005 || Catalina || CSS || — || align=right | 3.2 km || 
|-id=526 bgcolor=#d6d6d6
| 248526 ||  || — || November 29, 2005 || Socorro || LINEAR || — || align=right | 7.3 km || 
|-id=527 bgcolor=#fefefe
| 248527 ||  || — || November 30, 2005 || Socorro || LINEAR || FLO || align=right | 2.6 km || 
|-id=528 bgcolor=#d6d6d6
| 248528 ||  || — || November 30, 2005 || Mount Lemmon || Mount Lemmon Survey || EUP || align=right | 8.0 km || 
|-id=529 bgcolor=#d6d6d6
| 248529 ||  || — || November 25, 2005 || Mount Lemmon || Mount Lemmon Survey || — || align=right | 7.6 km || 
|-id=530 bgcolor=#d6d6d6
| 248530 ||  || — || November 25, 2005 || Catalina || CSS || — || align=right | 4.2 km || 
|-id=531 bgcolor=#d6d6d6
| 248531 ||  || — || November 26, 2005 || Mount Lemmon || Mount Lemmon Survey || — || align=right | 5.4 km || 
|-id=532 bgcolor=#d6d6d6
| 248532 ||  || — || November 29, 2005 || Kitt Peak || Spacewatch || — || align=right | 4.7 km || 
|-id=533 bgcolor=#d6d6d6
| 248533 ||  || — || November 21, 2005 || Catalina || CSS || — || align=right | 4.8 km || 
|-id=534 bgcolor=#d6d6d6
| 248534 ||  || — || November 22, 2005 || Catalina || CSS || LIX || align=right | 4.6 km || 
|-id=535 bgcolor=#d6d6d6
| 248535 ||  || — || November 29, 2005 || Anderson Mesa || LONEOS || — || align=right | 5.3 km || 
|-id=536 bgcolor=#fefefe
| 248536 ||  || — || November 29, 2005 || Socorro || LINEAR || — || align=right | 2.1 km || 
|-id=537 bgcolor=#d6d6d6
| 248537 ||  || — || November 30, 2005 || Socorro || LINEAR || — || align=right | 5.7 km || 
|-id=538 bgcolor=#fefefe
| 248538 ||  || — || November 30, 2005 || Socorro || LINEAR || — || align=right | 2.0 km || 
|-id=539 bgcolor=#d6d6d6
| 248539 ||  || — || November 21, 2005 || Palomar || NEAT || TIR || align=right | 4.5 km || 
|-id=540 bgcolor=#E9E9E9
| 248540 ||  || — || November 26, 2005 || Mount Lemmon || Mount Lemmon Survey || NEM || align=right | 3.2 km || 
|-id=541 bgcolor=#d6d6d6
| 248541 ||  || — || December 1, 2005 || Kitt Peak || Spacewatch || THM || align=right | 3.2 km || 
|-id=542 bgcolor=#d6d6d6
| 248542 ||  || — || December 1, 2005 || Palomar || NEAT || LIX || align=right | 5.3 km || 
|-id=543 bgcolor=#E9E9E9
| 248543 ||  || — || December 1, 2005 || Kitt Peak || Spacewatch || — || align=right | 3.1 km || 
|-id=544 bgcolor=#d6d6d6
| 248544 ||  || — || December 2, 2005 || Socorro || LINEAR || — || align=right | 2.1 km || 
|-id=545 bgcolor=#fefefe
| 248545 ||  || — || December 4, 2005 || Kitt Peak || Spacewatch || — || align=right | 1.8 km || 
|-id=546 bgcolor=#d6d6d6
| 248546 ||  || — || December 1, 2005 || Palomar || NEAT || HYG || align=right | 3.0 km || 
|-id=547 bgcolor=#d6d6d6
| 248547 ||  || — || December 7, 2005 || Socorro || LINEAR || — || align=right | 4.7 km || 
|-id=548 bgcolor=#d6d6d6
| 248548 ||  || — || December 4, 2005 || Catalina || CSS || EUP || align=right | 6.6 km || 
|-id=549 bgcolor=#d6d6d6
| 248549 ||  || — || December 8, 2005 || Kitt Peak || Spacewatch || — || align=right | 3.8 km || 
|-id=550 bgcolor=#C2FFFF
| 248550 ||  || — || December 10, 2005 || Kitt Peak || Spacewatch || L5 || align=right | 14 km || 
|-id=551 bgcolor=#E9E9E9
| 248551 ||  || — || December 3, 2005 || Mauna Kea || Mauna Kea Obs. || — || align=right | 3.2 km || 
|-id=552 bgcolor=#d6d6d6
| 248552 || 2005 YA || — || December 17, 2005 || Great Shefford || P. Birtwhistle || EUP || align=right | 7.2 km || 
|-id=553 bgcolor=#fefefe
| 248553 ||  || — || December 22, 2005 || Kitt Peak || Spacewatch || — || align=right | 1.4 km || 
|-id=554 bgcolor=#d6d6d6
| 248554 ||  || — || December 24, 2005 || Palomar || NEAT || — || align=right | 4.7 km || 
|-id=555 bgcolor=#d6d6d6
| 248555 ||  || — || December 21, 2005 || Catalina || CSS || — || align=right | 6.1 km || 
|-id=556 bgcolor=#E9E9E9
| 248556 ||  || — || December 25, 2005 || Kitt Peak || Spacewatch || — || align=right | 3.3 km || 
|-id=557 bgcolor=#E9E9E9
| 248557 ||  || — || December 25, 2005 || Mount Lemmon || Mount Lemmon Survey || — || align=right | 3.3 km || 
|-id=558 bgcolor=#d6d6d6
| 248558 ||  || — || December 26, 2005 || Kitt Peak || Spacewatch || — || align=right | 3.5 km || 
|-id=559 bgcolor=#fefefe
| 248559 ||  || — || December 29, 2005 || Mount Lemmon || Mount Lemmon Survey || — || align=right | 2.3 km || 
|-id=560 bgcolor=#d6d6d6
| 248560 ||  || — || December 30, 2005 || Socorro || LINEAR || — || align=right | 5.5 km || 
|-id=561 bgcolor=#d6d6d6
| 248561 ||  || — || December 25, 2005 || Mount Lemmon || Mount Lemmon Survey || — || align=right | 4.5 km || 
|-id=562 bgcolor=#d6d6d6
| 248562 ||  || — || December 22, 2005 || Catalina || CSS || — || align=right | 5.7 km || 
|-id=563 bgcolor=#E9E9E9
| 248563 ||  || — || December 25, 2005 || Catalina || CSS || — || align=right | 1.7 km || 
|-id=564 bgcolor=#E9E9E9
| 248564 ||  || — || December 30, 2005 || Kitt Peak || Spacewatch || — || align=right | 3.7 km || 
|-id=565 bgcolor=#d6d6d6
| 248565 ||  || — || December 30, 2005 || Kitt Peak || Spacewatch || — || align=right | 3.4 km || 
|-id=566 bgcolor=#fefefe
| 248566 ||  || — || January 2, 2006 || Catalina || CSS || H || align=right data-sort-value="0.90" | 900 m || 
|-id=567 bgcolor=#d6d6d6
| 248567 ||  || — || January 5, 2006 || Catalina || CSS || — || align=right | 4.4 km || 
|-id=568 bgcolor=#E9E9E9
| 248568 ||  || — || January 2, 2006 || Mount Lemmon || Mount Lemmon Survey || — || align=right | 3.8 km || 
|-id=569 bgcolor=#d6d6d6
| 248569 ||  || — || January 8, 2006 || Catalina || CSS || — || align=right | 7.0 km || 
|-id=570 bgcolor=#d6d6d6
| 248570 ||  || — || January 5, 2006 || Anderson Mesa || LONEOS || HYG || align=right | 4.3 km || 
|-id=571 bgcolor=#d6d6d6
| 248571 ||  || — || January 4, 2006 || Kitt Peak || Spacewatch || 3:2 || align=right | 5.4 km || 
|-id=572 bgcolor=#d6d6d6
| 248572 ||  || — || January 7, 2006 || Mount Lemmon || Mount Lemmon Survey || 7:4 || align=right | 6.0 km || 
|-id=573 bgcolor=#fefefe
| 248573 ||  || — || January 21, 2006 || Mount Lemmon || Mount Lemmon Survey || NYS || align=right | 1.8 km || 
|-id=574 bgcolor=#fefefe
| 248574 ||  || — || January 20, 2006 || Kitt Peak || Spacewatch || — || align=right data-sort-value="0.94" | 940 m || 
|-id=575 bgcolor=#C2FFFF
| 248575 ||  || — || January 21, 2006 || Kitt Peak || Spacewatch || L5 || align=right | 13 km || 
|-id=576 bgcolor=#E9E9E9
| 248576 ||  || — || January 23, 2006 || Kitt Peak || Spacewatch || BRU || align=right | 4.2 km || 
|-id=577 bgcolor=#E9E9E9
| 248577 ||  || — || January 21, 2006 || Palomar || NEAT || — || align=right | 3.0 km || 
|-id=578 bgcolor=#d6d6d6
| 248578 ||  || — || January 25, 2006 || Kitt Peak || Spacewatch || — || align=right | 2.6 km || 
|-id=579 bgcolor=#d6d6d6
| 248579 ||  || — || January 26, 2006 || Kitt Peak || Spacewatch || — || align=right | 5.1 km || 
|-id=580 bgcolor=#fefefe
| 248580 ||  || — || January 25, 2006 || Kitt Peak || Spacewatch || — || align=right data-sort-value="0.88" | 880 m || 
|-id=581 bgcolor=#d6d6d6
| 248581 ||  || — || January 28, 2006 || Kitt Peak || Spacewatch || — || align=right | 3.2 km || 
|-id=582 bgcolor=#fefefe
| 248582 ||  || — || January 31, 2006 || Kitt Peak || Spacewatch || — || align=right data-sort-value="0.90" | 900 m || 
|-id=583 bgcolor=#fefefe
| 248583 ||  || — || January 31, 2006 || Kitt Peak || Spacewatch || — || align=right | 1.0 km || 
|-id=584 bgcolor=#fefefe
| 248584 ||  || — || January 28, 2006 || Catalina || CSS || PHO || align=right | 1.5 km || 
|-id=585 bgcolor=#d6d6d6
| 248585 ||  || — || January 30, 2006 || Kitt Peak || Spacewatch || — || align=right | 3.7 km || 
|-id=586 bgcolor=#d6d6d6
| 248586 ||  || — || January 30, 2006 || Kitt Peak || Spacewatch || — || align=right | 3.9 km || 
|-id=587 bgcolor=#fefefe
| 248587 ||  || — || January 31, 2006 || Mount Lemmon || Mount Lemmon Survey || — || align=right data-sort-value="0.88" | 880 m || 
|-id=588 bgcolor=#E9E9E9
| 248588 ||  || — || January 31, 2006 || Kitt Peak || Spacewatch || MIS || align=right | 2.6 km || 
|-id=589 bgcolor=#E9E9E9
| 248589 ||  || — || January 26, 2006 || Kitt Peak || Spacewatch || — || align=right | 3.9 km || 
|-id=590 bgcolor=#FFC2E0
| 248590 ||  || — || February 1, 2006 || Siding Spring || SSS || APO +1km || align=right | 4.7 km || 
|-id=591 bgcolor=#fefefe
| 248591 ||  || — || February 2, 2006 || Mount Lemmon || Mount Lemmon Survey || — || align=right data-sort-value="0.95" | 950 m || 
|-id=592 bgcolor=#E9E9E9
| 248592 ||  || — || February 2, 2006 || Kitt Peak || Spacewatch || — || align=right | 2.4 km || 
|-id=593 bgcolor=#fefefe
| 248593 ||  || — || February 2, 2006 || Mount Lemmon || Mount Lemmon Survey || NYS || align=right data-sort-value="0.77" | 770 m || 
|-id=594 bgcolor=#fefefe
| 248594 ||  || — || February 21, 2006 || Anderson Mesa || LONEOS || ERI || align=right | 2.3 km || 
|-id=595 bgcolor=#fefefe
| 248595 ||  || — || February 22, 2006 || Catalina || CSS || FLO || align=right data-sort-value="0.89" | 890 m || 
|-id=596 bgcolor=#fefefe
| 248596 ||  || — || February 22, 2006 || Socorro || LINEAR || FLO || align=right | 1.2 km || 
|-id=597 bgcolor=#E9E9E9
| 248597 ||  || — || February 20, 2006 || Kitt Peak || Spacewatch || HOF || align=right | 3.4 km || 
|-id=598 bgcolor=#fefefe
| 248598 ||  || — || February 20, 2006 || Kitt Peak || Spacewatch || — || align=right | 1.1 km || 
|-id=599 bgcolor=#E9E9E9
| 248599 ||  || — || February 20, 2006 || Mount Lemmon || Mount Lemmon Survey || — || align=right | 2.4 km || 
|-id=600 bgcolor=#fefefe
| 248600 ||  || — || February 20, 2006 || Mount Lemmon || Mount Lemmon Survey || — || align=right | 1.0 km || 
|}

248601–248700 

|-bgcolor=#E9E9E9
| 248601 ||  || — || February 20, 2006 || Mount Lemmon || Mount Lemmon Survey || — || align=right | 3.2 km || 
|-id=602 bgcolor=#fefefe
| 248602 ||  || — || February 21, 2006 || Anderson Mesa || LONEOS || — || align=right | 1.2 km || 
|-id=603 bgcolor=#C2FFFF
| 248603 ||  || — || February 20, 2006 || Kitt Peak || Spacewatch || L5 || align=right | 9.0 km || 
|-id=604 bgcolor=#E9E9E9
| 248604 ||  || — || February 21, 2006 || Catalina || CSS || — || align=right | 2.1 km || 
|-id=605 bgcolor=#E9E9E9
| 248605 ||  || — || February 24, 2006 || Kitt Peak || Spacewatch || HOF || align=right | 2.8 km || 
|-id=606 bgcolor=#fefefe
| 248606 ||  || — || February 22, 2006 || Catalina || CSS || FLO || align=right | 1.1 km || 
|-id=607 bgcolor=#fefefe
| 248607 ||  || — || February 23, 2006 || Kitt Peak || Spacewatch || — || align=right | 2.5 km || 
|-id=608 bgcolor=#E9E9E9
| 248608 ||  || — || February 24, 2006 || Kitt Peak || Spacewatch || EUN || align=right | 2.1 km || 
|-id=609 bgcolor=#d6d6d6
| 248609 ||  || — || February 25, 2006 || Socorro || LINEAR || ALA || align=right | 5.3 km || 
|-id=610 bgcolor=#fefefe
| 248610 ||  || — || February 21, 2006 || Anderson Mesa || LONEOS || — || align=right | 1.0 km || 
|-id=611 bgcolor=#E9E9E9
| 248611 ||  || — || February 25, 2006 || Kitt Peak || Spacewatch || NEM || align=right | 2.6 km || 
|-id=612 bgcolor=#fefefe
| 248612 ||  || — || February 25, 2006 || Mount Lemmon || Mount Lemmon Survey || — || align=right data-sort-value="0.85" | 850 m || 
|-id=613 bgcolor=#E9E9E9
| 248613 ||  || — || February 25, 2006 || Mount Lemmon || Mount Lemmon Survey || — || align=right | 2.1 km || 
|-id=614 bgcolor=#E9E9E9
| 248614 ||  || — || February 25, 2006 || Kitt Peak || Spacewatch || HNA || align=right | 2.8 km || 
|-id=615 bgcolor=#E9E9E9
| 248615 ||  || — || February 25, 2006 || Kitt Peak || Spacewatch || — || align=right | 3.6 km || 
|-id=616 bgcolor=#fefefe
| 248616 ||  || — || February 25, 2006 || Kitt Peak || Spacewatch || FLO || align=right | 1.1 km || 
|-id=617 bgcolor=#E9E9E9
| 248617 ||  || — || February 27, 2006 || Kitt Peak || Spacewatch || — || align=right | 4.0 km || 
|-id=618 bgcolor=#fefefe
| 248618 ||  || — || February 28, 2006 || Mount Lemmon || Mount Lemmon Survey || — || align=right data-sort-value="0.86" | 860 m || 
|-id=619 bgcolor=#fefefe
| 248619 ||  || — || March 3, 2006 || Nyukasa || Mount Nyukasa Stn. || — || align=right data-sort-value="0.96" | 960 m || 
|-id=620 bgcolor=#fefefe
| 248620 ||  || — || March 2, 2006 || Kitt Peak || Spacewatch || — || align=right data-sort-value="0.73" | 730 m || 
|-id=621 bgcolor=#E9E9E9
| 248621 ||  || — || March 2, 2006 || Kitt Peak || Spacewatch || AEO || align=right | 2.0 km || 
|-id=622 bgcolor=#E9E9E9
| 248622 ||  || — || March 4, 2006 || Kitt Peak || Spacewatch || — || align=right | 2.8 km || 
|-id=623 bgcolor=#fefefe
| 248623 ||  || — || March 5, 2006 || Kitt Peak || Spacewatch || FLO || align=right data-sort-value="0.87" | 870 m || 
|-id=624 bgcolor=#fefefe
| 248624 ||  || — || March 5, 2006 || Kitt Peak || Spacewatch || — || align=right data-sort-value="0.94" | 940 m || 
|-id=625 bgcolor=#E9E9E9
| 248625 ||  || — || March 16, 2006 || Palomar || NEAT || — || align=right | 1.6 km || 
|-id=626 bgcolor=#d6d6d6
| 248626 ||  || — || March 23, 2006 || Kitt Peak || Spacewatch || — || align=right | 4.7 km || 
|-id=627 bgcolor=#fefefe
| 248627 ||  || — || March 23, 2006 || Socorro || LINEAR || — || align=right | 1.8 km || 
|-id=628 bgcolor=#fefefe
| 248628 ||  || — || March 23, 2006 || Kitt Peak || Spacewatch || — || align=right | 1.6 km || 
|-id=629 bgcolor=#fefefe
| 248629 ||  || — || March 23, 2006 || Mount Lemmon || Mount Lemmon Survey || PHO || align=right | 1.0 km || 
|-id=630 bgcolor=#fefefe
| 248630 ||  || — || March 24, 2006 || Kitt Peak || Spacewatch || FLO || align=right | 1.3 km || 
|-id=631 bgcolor=#fefefe
| 248631 ||  || — || March 24, 2006 || Kitt Peak || Spacewatch || NYS || align=right | 1.8 km || 
|-id=632 bgcolor=#E9E9E9
| 248632 ||  || — || March 24, 2006 || Mount Lemmon || Mount Lemmon Survey || HOF || align=right | 3.5 km || 
|-id=633 bgcolor=#fefefe
| 248633 ||  || — || March 29, 2006 || Socorro || LINEAR || — || align=right | 1.0 km || 
|-id=634 bgcolor=#d6d6d6
| 248634 ||  || — || March 24, 2006 || Catalina || CSS || — || align=right | 6.2 km || 
|-id=635 bgcolor=#fefefe
| 248635 ||  || — || March 27, 2006 || Siding Spring || SSS || PHO || align=right | 1.4 km || 
|-id=636 bgcolor=#fefefe
| 248636 ||  || — || March 25, 2006 || Mount Lemmon || Mount Lemmon Survey || — || align=right | 1.5 km || 
|-id=637 bgcolor=#fefefe
| 248637 ||  || — || April 2, 2006 || Reedy Creek || J. Broughton || — || align=right | 1.7 km || 
|-id=638 bgcolor=#E9E9E9
| 248638 ||  || — || April 2, 2006 || Kitt Peak || Spacewatch || — || align=right | 3.1 km || 
|-id=639 bgcolor=#fefefe
| 248639 ||  || — || April 2, 2006 || Kitt Peak || Spacewatch || — || align=right data-sort-value="0.89" | 890 m || 
|-id=640 bgcolor=#fefefe
| 248640 ||  || — || April 2, 2006 || Socorro || LINEAR || — || align=right | 1.2 km || 
|-id=641 bgcolor=#E9E9E9
| 248641 ||  || — || April 6, 2006 || Socorro || LINEAR || DOR || align=right | 3.4 km || 
|-id=642 bgcolor=#fefefe
| 248642 ||  || — || April 6, 2006 || Socorro || LINEAR || FLO || align=right | 1.8 km || 
|-id=643 bgcolor=#fefefe
| 248643 ||  || — || April 6, 2006 || Catalina || CSS || — || align=right | 1.6 km || 
|-id=644 bgcolor=#fefefe
| 248644 ||  || — || April 18, 2006 || Catalina || CSS || FLO || align=right data-sort-value="0.99" | 990 m || 
|-id=645 bgcolor=#E9E9E9
| 248645 ||  || — || April 19, 2006 || Mount Lemmon || Mount Lemmon Survey || AEO || align=right | 2.1 km || 
|-id=646 bgcolor=#fefefe
| 248646 ||  || — || April 19, 2006 || Catalina || CSS || — || align=right | 2.0 km || 
|-id=647 bgcolor=#E9E9E9
| 248647 ||  || — || April 18, 2006 || Kitt Peak || Spacewatch || — || align=right | 2.3 km || 
|-id=648 bgcolor=#E9E9E9
| 248648 ||  || — || April 21, 2006 || Kitt Peak || Spacewatch || KON || align=right | 2.9 km || 
|-id=649 bgcolor=#fefefe
| 248649 ||  || — || April 21, 2006 || Kitt Peak || Spacewatch || — || align=right | 1.3 km || 
|-id=650 bgcolor=#fefefe
| 248650 ||  || — || April 20, 2006 || Kitt Peak || Spacewatch || NYS || align=right | 1.8 km || 
|-id=651 bgcolor=#d6d6d6
| 248651 ||  || — || April 20, 2006 || Catalina || CSS || — || align=right | 5.3 km || 
|-id=652 bgcolor=#fefefe
| 248652 ||  || — || April 19, 2006 || Catalina || CSS || — || align=right | 2.0 km || 
|-id=653 bgcolor=#E9E9E9
| 248653 ||  || — || April 23, 2006 || Socorro || LINEAR || MIT || align=right | 1.6 km || 
|-id=654 bgcolor=#fefefe
| 248654 ||  || — || April 24, 2006 || Kitt Peak || Spacewatch || — || align=right | 1.9 km || 
|-id=655 bgcolor=#fefefe
| 248655 ||  || — || April 24, 2006 || Kitt Peak || Spacewatch || NYS || align=right | 1.0 km || 
|-id=656 bgcolor=#fefefe
| 248656 ||  || — || April 24, 2006 || Kitt Peak || Spacewatch || — || align=right | 1.6 km || 
|-id=657 bgcolor=#d6d6d6
| 248657 ||  || — || April 25, 2006 || Kitt Peak || Spacewatch || — || align=right | 4.9 km || 
|-id=658 bgcolor=#fefefe
| 248658 ||  || — || April 26, 2006 || Kitt Peak || Spacewatch || NYS || align=right | 1.3 km || 
|-id=659 bgcolor=#d6d6d6
| 248659 ||  || — || April 26, 2006 || Kitt Peak || Spacewatch || — || align=right | 4.0 km || 
|-id=660 bgcolor=#fefefe
| 248660 ||  || — || April 29, 2006 || Catalina || CSS || — || align=right | 1.3 km || 
|-id=661 bgcolor=#E9E9E9
| 248661 ||  || — || April 30, 2006 || Kitt Peak || Spacewatch || — || align=right | 3.0 km || 
|-id=662 bgcolor=#fefefe
| 248662 ||  || — || April 29, 2006 || Kitt Peak || Spacewatch || — || align=right | 1.1 km || 
|-id=663 bgcolor=#fefefe
| 248663 ||  || — || April 30, 2006 || Anderson Mesa || LONEOS || NYS || align=right data-sort-value="0.92" | 920 m || 
|-id=664 bgcolor=#fefefe
| 248664 ||  || — || April 19, 2006 || Mount Lemmon || Mount Lemmon Survey || NYS || align=right data-sort-value="0.76" | 760 m || 
|-id=665 bgcolor=#E9E9E9
| 248665 ||  || — || May 3, 2006 || Kitt Peak || Spacewatch || PAD || align=right | 3.3 km || 
|-id=666 bgcolor=#d6d6d6
| 248666 ||  || — || May 4, 2006 || Kitt Peak || Spacewatch || — || align=right | 5.9 km || 
|-id=667 bgcolor=#d6d6d6
| 248667 ||  || — || May 2, 2006 || Kitt Peak || Spacewatch || — || align=right | 4.0 km || 
|-id=668 bgcolor=#d6d6d6
| 248668 ||  || — || May 2, 2006 || Kitt Peak || Spacewatch || EOS || align=right | 5.3 km || 
|-id=669 bgcolor=#fefefe
| 248669 ||  || — || May 5, 2006 || Mount Lemmon || Mount Lemmon Survey || V || align=right data-sort-value="0.84" | 840 m || 
|-id=670 bgcolor=#C2FFFF
| 248670 ||  || — || May 3, 2006 || Mount Lemmon || Mount Lemmon Survey || L5 || align=right | 14 km || 
|-id=671 bgcolor=#E9E9E9
| 248671 ||  || — || May 6, 2006 || Kitt Peak || Spacewatch || DOR || align=right | 4.7 km || 
|-id=672 bgcolor=#d6d6d6
| 248672 ||  || — || May 7, 2006 || Kitt Peak || Spacewatch || — || align=right | 4.5 km || 
|-id=673 bgcolor=#fefefe
| 248673 ||  || — || May 6, 2006 || Mount Lemmon || Mount Lemmon Survey || CHL || align=right | 1.6 km || 
|-id=674 bgcolor=#E9E9E9
| 248674 ||  || — || May 1, 2006 || Kitt Peak || Spacewatch || PAE || align=right | 2.8 km || 
|-id=675 bgcolor=#d6d6d6
| 248675 ||  || — || May 8, 2006 || Mount Lemmon || Mount Lemmon Survey || — || align=right | 4.3 km || 
|-id=676 bgcolor=#E9E9E9
| 248676 ||  || — || May 14, 2006 || Palomar || NEAT || POS || align=right | 3.5 km || 
|-id=677 bgcolor=#fefefe
| 248677 ||  || — || May 5, 2006 || Kitt Peak || Spacewatch || — || align=right data-sort-value="0.84" | 840 m || 
|-id=678 bgcolor=#fefefe
| 248678 ||  || — || May 19, 2006 || Mount Lemmon || Mount Lemmon Survey || NYS || align=right data-sort-value="0.80" | 800 m || 
|-id=679 bgcolor=#d6d6d6
| 248679 ||  || — || May 19, 2006 || Catalina || CSS || Tj (2.96) || align=right | 7.7 km || 
|-id=680 bgcolor=#E9E9E9
| 248680 ||  || — || May 19, 2006 || Palomar || NEAT || — || align=right | 2.8 km || 
|-id=681 bgcolor=#d6d6d6
| 248681 ||  || — || May 20, 2006 || Palomar || NEAT || — || align=right | 4.3 km || 
|-id=682 bgcolor=#fefefe
| 248682 ||  || — || May 20, 2006 || Siding Spring || SSS || MAS || align=right data-sort-value="0.97" | 970 m || 
|-id=683 bgcolor=#d6d6d6
| 248683 ||  || — || May 19, 2006 || Palomar || NEAT || — || align=right | 4.1 km || 
|-id=684 bgcolor=#fefefe
| 248684 ||  || — || May 21, 2006 || Mount Lemmon || Mount Lemmon Survey || FLO || align=right data-sort-value="0.91" | 910 m || 
|-id=685 bgcolor=#fefefe
| 248685 ||  || — || May 21, 2006 || Kitt Peak || Spacewatch || — || align=right | 1.2 km || 
|-id=686 bgcolor=#fefefe
| 248686 ||  || — || May 21, 2006 || Kitt Peak || Spacewatch || — || align=right | 1.0 km || 
|-id=687 bgcolor=#fefefe
| 248687 ||  || — || May 22, 2006 || Kitt Peak || Spacewatch || FLO || align=right data-sort-value="0.86" | 860 m || 
|-id=688 bgcolor=#E9E9E9
| 248688 ||  || — || May 22, 2006 || Kitt Peak || Spacewatch || ADE || align=right | 3.3 km || 
|-id=689 bgcolor=#fefefe
| 248689 ||  || — || May 22, 2006 || Kitt Peak || Spacewatch || V || align=right data-sort-value="0.82" | 820 m || 
|-id=690 bgcolor=#d6d6d6
| 248690 ||  || — || May 23, 2006 || Kitt Peak || Spacewatch || — || align=right | 2.4 km || 
|-id=691 bgcolor=#fefefe
| 248691 ||  || — || May 24, 2006 || Mount Lemmon || Mount Lemmon Survey || — || align=right | 2.2 km || 
|-id=692 bgcolor=#d6d6d6
| 248692 ||  || — || May 25, 2006 || Mount Lemmon || Mount Lemmon Survey || — || align=right | 6.7 km || 
|-id=693 bgcolor=#d6d6d6
| 248693 ||  || — || May 25, 2006 || Kitt Peak || Spacewatch || — || align=right | 4.8 km || 
|-id=694 bgcolor=#d6d6d6
| 248694 ||  || — || May 25, 2006 || Socorro || LINEAR || ALA || align=right | 5.6 km || 
|-id=695 bgcolor=#d6d6d6
| 248695 ||  || — || May 31, 2006 || Mount Lemmon || Mount Lemmon Survey || ALA || align=right | 3.9 km || 
|-id=696 bgcolor=#d6d6d6
| 248696 ||  || — || May 29, 2006 || Kitt Peak || Spacewatch || NAE || align=right | 3.4 km || 
|-id=697 bgcolor=#fefefe
| 248697 ||  || — || May 28, 2006 || Kitt Peak || Spacewatch || EUT || align=right data-sort-value="0.66" | 660 m || 
|-id=698 bgcolor=#d6d6d6
| 248698 ||  || — || May 20, 2006 || Catalina || CSS || — || align=right | 4.7 km || 
|-id=699 bgcolor=#E9E9E9
| 248699 ||  || — || May 23, 2006 || Siding Spring || SSS || — || align=right | 3.9 km || 
|-id=700 bgcolor=#E9E9E9
| 248700 ||  || — || June 18, 2006 || Kitt Peak || Spacewatch || — || align=right | 1.8 km || 
|}

248701–248800 

|-bgcolor=#fefefe
| 248701 ||  || — || June 17, 2006 || Kitt Peak || Spacewatch || MAS || align=right | 1.4 km || 
|-id=702 bgcolor=#E9E9E9
| 248702 ||  || — || June 17, 2006 || Siding Spring || SSS || — || align=right | 3.9 km || 
|-id=703 bgcolor=#E9E9E9
| 248703 ||  || — || June 18, 2006 || Siding Spring || SSS || — || align=right | 4.2 km || 
|-id=704 bgcolor=#E9E9E9
| 248704 ||  || — || June 30, 2006 || Hibiscus || S. F. Hönig || — || align=right | 1.6 km || 
|-id=705 bgcolor=#fefefe
| 248705 ||  || — || June 23, 2006 || Anderson Mesa || LONEOS || — || align=right | 1.2 km || 
|-id=706 bgcolor=#fefefe
| 248706 || 2006 NC || — || July 1, 2006 || Pla D'Arguines || Pla D'Arguines Obs. || — || align=right | 1.4 km || 
|-id=707 bgcolor=#fefefe
| 248707 ||  || — || July 19, 2006 || Lulin Observatory || LUSS || — || align=right | 1.5 km || 
|-id=708 bgcolor=#d6d6d6
| 248708 ||  || — || July 23, 2006 || Pla D'Arguines || R. Ferrando || NAE || align=right | 3.9 km || 
|-id=709 bgcolor=#fefefe
| 248709 ||  || — || July 21, 2006 || Catalina || CSS || CHL || align=right | 2.4 km || 
|-id=710 bgcolor=#E9E9E9
| 248710 ||  || — || July 20, 2006 || Palomar || NEAT || JUN || align=right | 1.5 km || 
|-id=711 bgcolor=#fefefe
| 248711 ||  || — || July 21, 2006 || Anderson Mesa || LONEOS || — || align=right | 1.0 km || 
|-id=712 bgcolor=#E9E9E9
| 248712 ||  || — || July 28, 2006 || Siding Spring || SSS || — || align=right | 1.7 km || 
|-id=713 bgcolor=#E9E9E9
| 248713 ||  || — || August 6, 2006 || Anderson Mesa || LONEOS || — || align=right | 1.4 km || 
|-id=714 bgcolor=#E9E9E9
| 248714 ||  || — || August 12, 2006 || Palomar || NEAT || — || align=right | 1.6 km || 
|-id=715 bgcolor=#E9E9E9
| 248715 ||  || — || August 15, 2006 || Palomar || NEAT || MIT || align=right | 1.6 km || 
|-id=716 bgcolor=#E9E9E9
| 248716 ||  || — || August 13, 2006 || Siding Spring || SSS || — || align=right | 3.7 km || 
|-id=717 bgcolor=#E9E9E9
| 248717 ||  || — || August 18, 2006 || Piszkéstető || K. Sárneczky, Z. Kuli || KON || align=right | 2.6 km || 
|-id=718 bgcolor=#d6d6d6
| 248718 ||  || — || August 19, 2006 || Kitt Peak || Spacewatch || — || align=right | 6.6 km || 
|-id=719 bgcolor=#E9E9E9
| 248719 ||  || — || August 19, 2006 || Kitt Peak || Spacewatch || — || align=right | 2.7 km || 
|-id=720 bgcolor=#E9E9E9
| 248720 ||  || — || August 17, 2006 || Palomar || NEAT || DOR || align=right | 2.9 km || 
|-id=721 bgcolor=#d6d6d6
| 248721 ||  || — || August 17, 2006 || Palomar || NEAT || — || align=right | 5.1 km || 
|-id=722 bgcolor=#E9E9E9
| 248722 ||  || — || August 17, 2006 || Palomar || NEAT || — || align=right | 1.9 km || 
|-id=723 bgcolor=#E9E9E9
| 248723 ||  || — || August 17, 2006 || Palomar || NEAT || — || align=right | 1.0 km || 
|-id=724 bgcolor=#E9E9E9
| 248724 ||  || — || August 19, 2006 || Anderson Mesa || LONEOS || — || align=right | 1.5 km || 
|-id=725 bgcolor=#fefefe
| 248725 ||  || — || August 19, 2006 || Anderson Mesa || LONEOS || — || align=right | 1.2 km || 
|-id=726 bgcolor=#E9E9E9
| 248726 ||  || — || August 19, 2006 || Anderson Mesa || LONEOS || — || align=right | 2.4 km || 
|-id=727 bgcolor=#E9E9E9
| 248727 ||  || — || August 21, 2006 || Kitt Peak || Spacewatch || PAD || align=right | 2.8 km || 
|-id=728 bgcolor=#E9E9E9
| 248728 ||  || — || August 21, 2006 || Kitt Peak || Spacewatch || — || align=right | 2.8 km || 
|-id=729 bgcolor=#E9E9E9
| 248729 ||  || — || August 22, 2006 || Palomar || NEAT || — || align=right | 1.8 km || 
|-id=730 bgcolor=#E9E9E9
| 248730 ||  || — || August 21, 2006 || Socorro || LINEAR || — || align=right | 3.0 km || 
|-id=731 bgcolor=#E9E9E9
| 248731 ||  || — || August 27, 2006 || Kitt Peak || Spacewatch || — || align=right | 2.5 km || 
|-id=732 bgcolor=#E9E9E9
| 248732 ||  || — || August 21, 2006 || Palomar || NEAT || — || align=right | 3.6 km || 
|-id=733 bgcolor=#E9E9E9
| 248733 ||  || — || August 21, 2006 || Socorro || LINEAR || — || align=right | 1.9 km || 
|-id=734 bgcolor=#d6d6d6
| 248734 ||  || — || August 23, 2006 || Palomar || NEAT || URS || align=right | 4.2 km || 
|-id=735 bgcolor=#d6d6d6
| 248735 ||  || — || August 27, 2006 || Anderson Mesa || LONEOS || — || align=right | 5.8 km || 
|-id=736 bgcolor=#E9E9E9
| 248736 ||  || — || August 27, 2006 || Anderson Mesa || LONEOS || — || align=right | 2.0 km || 
|-id=737 bgcolor=#E9E9E9
| 248737 ||  || — || August 27, 2006 || Anderson Mesa || LONEOS || — || align=right | 1.6 km || 
|-id=738 bgcolor=#E9E9E9
| 248738 ||  || — || August 21, 2006 || Palomar || NEAT || — || align=right | 1.4 km || 
|-id=739 bgcolor=#E9E9E9
| 248739 ||  || — || August 22, 2006 || Palomar || NEAT || — || align=right | 2.8 km || 
|-id=740 bgcolor=#E9E9E9
| 248740 ||  || — || August 29, 2006 || Anderson Mesa || LONEOS || — || align=right | 1.7 km || 
|-id=741 bgcolor=#E9E9E9
| 248741 ||  || — || August 30, 2006 || Marly || Naef Obs. || — || align=right | 3.4 km || 
|-id=742 bgcolor=#d6d6d6
| 248742 ||  || — || August 17, 2006 || Palomar || NEAT || — || align=right | 4.8 km || 
|-id=743 bgcolor=#E9E9E9
| 248743 ||  || — || August 18, 2006 || Palomar || NEAT || GER || align=right | 2.5 km || 
|-id=744 bgcolor=#E9E9E9
| 248744 ||  || — || August 29, 2006 || Catalina || CSS || — || align=right | 3.0 km || 
|-id=745 bgcolor=#d6d6d6
| 248745 ||  || — || August 29, 2006 || Catalina || CSS || URS || align=right | 6.5 km || 
|-id=746 bgcolor=#d6d6d6
| 248746 ||  || — || August 30, 2006 || Anderson Mesa || LONEOS || — || align=right | 4.3 km || 
|-id=747 bgcolor=#E9E9E9
| 248747 ||  || — || August 30, 2006 || Anderson Mesa || LONEOS || — || align=right | 2.4 km || 
|-id=748 bgcolor=#d6d6d6
| 248748 ||  || — || September 1, 2006 || Vicques || M. Ory || — || align=right | 5.2 km || 
|-id=749 bgcolor=#E9E9E9
| 248749 || 2006 RU || — || September 2, 2006 || Majorca || OAM Obs. || — || align=right | 3.0 km || 
|-id=750 bgcolor=#E9E9E9
| 248750 Asteroidday ||  ||  || September 4, 2006 || Roeser || M. Dawson || GEF || align=right | 4.8 km || 
|-id=751 bgcolor=#E9E9E9
| 248751 ||  || — || September 14, 2006 || Catalina || CSS || — || align=right | 1.8 km || 
|-id=752 bgcolor=#d6d6d6
| 248752 ||  || — || September 14, 2006 || Kitt Peak || Spacewatch || URS || align=right | 5.3 km || 
|-id=753 bgcolor=#E9E9E9
| 248753 ||  || — || September 14, 2006 || Palomar || NEAT || ADE || align=right | 2.4 km || 
|-id=754 bgcolor=#E9E9E9
| 248754 ||  || — || September 14, 2006 || Catalina || CSS || — || align=right | 4.1 km || 
|-id=755 bgcolor=#E9E9E9
| 248755 ||  || — || September 13, 2006 || Palomar || NEAT || — || align=right | 1.2 km || 
|-id=756 bgcolor=#E9E9E9
| 248756 ||  || — || September 15, 2006 || Socorro || LINEAR || — || align=right | 3.4 km || 
|-id=757 bgcolor=#E9E9E9
| 248757 ||  || — || September 15, 2006 || Kitt Peak || Spacewatch || — || align=right | 3.1 km || 
|-id=758 bgcolor=#E9E9E9
| 248758 ||  || — || September 12, 2006 || Catalina || CSS || — || align=right | 3.1 km || 
|-id=759 bgcolor=#E9E9E9
| 248759 ||  || — || September 14, 2006 || Palomar || NEAT || ADE || align=right | 2.4 km || 
|-id=760 bgcolor=#E9E9E9
| 248760 ||  || — || September 15, 2006 || Socorro || LINEAR || — || align=right | 3.0 km || 
|-id=761 bgcolor=#E9E9E9
| 248761 ||  || — || September 15, 2006 || Kitt Peak || Spacewatch || — || align=right | 1.7 km || 
|-id=762 bgcolor=#E9E9E9
| 248762 ||  || — || September 12, 2006 || Catalina || CSS || — || align=right | 2.6 km || 
|-id=763 bgcolor=#E9E9E9
| 248763 ||  || — || September 14, 2006 || Catalina || CSS || — || align=right | 1.1 km || 
|-id=764 bgcolor=#E9E9E9
| 248764 ||  || — || September 15, 2006 || Kitt Peak || Spacewatch || — || align=right | 4.2 km || 
|-id=765 bgcolor=#E9E9E9
| 248765 ||  || — || September 15, 2006 || Kitt Peak || Spacewatch || — || align=right | 2.8 km || 
|-id=766 bgcolor=#E9E9E9
| 248766 ||  || — || September 15, 2006 || Kitt Peak || Spacewatch || — || align=right | 2.6 km || 
|-id=767 bgcolor=#E9E9E9
| 248767 ||  || — || September 15, 2006 || Kitt Peak || Spacewatch || — || align=right | 2.0 km || 
|-id=768 bgcolor=#E9E9E9
| 248768 ||  || — || September 15, 2006 || Kitt Peak || Spacewatch || NEM || align=right | 2.7 km || 
|-id=769 bgcolor=#d6d6d6
| 248769 ||  || — || September 15, 2006 || Kitt Peak || Spacewatch || ALA || align=right | 5.3 km || 
|-id=770 bgcolor=#E9E9E9
| 248770 ||  || — || September 13, 2006 || Palomar || NEAT || — || align=right | 2.0 km || 
|-id=771 bgcolor=#E9E9E9
| 248771 ||  || — || September 6, 2006 || Palomar || NEAT || — || align=right | 3.4 km || 
|-id=772 bgcolor=#E9E9E9
| 248772 ||  || — || September 16, 2006 || Palomar || NEAT || — || align=right | 3.3 km || 
|-id=773 bgcolor=#d6d6d6
| 248773 ||  || — || September 17, 2006 || Catalina || CSS || — || align=right | 6.2 km || 
|-id=774 bgcolor=#E9E9E9
| 248774 ||  || — || September 16, 2006 || Palomar || NEAT || — || align=right | 2.8 km || 
|-id=775 bgcolor=#E9E9E9
| 248775 ||  || — || September 17, 2006 || Catalina || CSS || — || align=right | 1.8 km || 
|-id=776 bgcolor=#E9E9E9
| 248776 ||  || — || September 17, 2006 || Catalina || CSS || — || align=right | 2.3 km || 
|-id=777 bgcolor=#E9E9E9
| 248777 ||  || — || September 17, 2006 || Kitt Peak || Spacewatch || — || align=right | 1.5 km || 
|-id=778 bgcolor=#E9E9E9
| 248778 ||  || — || September 17, 2006 || Kitt Peak || Spacewatch || — || align=right | 2.2 km || 
|-id=779 bgcolor=#E9E9E9
| 248779 ||  || — || September 16, 2006 || Anderson Mesa || LONEOS || MAR || align=right | 1.9 km || 
|-id=780 bgcolor=#E9E9E9
| 248780 ||  || — || September 17, 2006 || Catalina || CSS || — || align=right | 3.3 km || 
|-id=781 bgcolor=#d6d6d6
| 248781 ||  || — || September 17, 2006 || Kitt Peak || Spacewatch || URS || align=right | 5.5 km || 
|-id=782 bgcolor=#E9E9E9
| 248782 ||  || — || September 18, 2006 || Kitt Peak || Spacewatch || WIT || align=right | 1.3 km || 
|-id=783 bgcolor=#E9E9E9
| 248783 ||  || — || September 18, 2006 || Catalina || CSS || IAN || align=right | 1.6 km || 
|-id=784 bgcolor=#E9E9E9
| 248784 ||  || — || September 18, 2006 || Catalina || CSS || — || align=right | 2.6 km || 
|-id=785 bgcolor=#E9E9E9
| 248785 ||  || — || September 19, 2006 || Kitt Peak || Spacewatch || — || align=right | 1.6 km || 
|-id=786 bgcolor=#E9E9E9
| 248786 ||  || — || September 16, 2006 || Catalina || CSS || — || align=right | 3.4 km || 
|-id=787 bgcolor=#E9E9E9
| 248787 ||  || — || September 18, 2006 || Calvin-Rehoboth || Calvin–Rehoboth Obs. || GEF || align=right | 1.3 km || 
|-id=788 bgcolor=#E9E9E9
| 248788 ||  || — || September 16, 2006 || Anderson Mesa || LONEOS || — || align=right | 2.2 km || 
|-id=789 bgcolor=#E9E9E9
| 248789 ||  || — || September 17, 2006 || Catalina || CSS || — || align=right | 2.2 km || 
|-id=790 bgcolor=#E9E9E9
| 248790 ||  || — || September 16, 2006 || Catalina || CSS || RAF || align=right | 1.9 km || 
|-id=791 bgcolor=#E9E9E9
| 248791 ||  || — || September 24, 2006 || Calvin-Rehoboth || L. A. Molnar || — || align=right | 3.2 km || 
|-id=792 bgcolor=#E9E9E9
| 248792 ||  || — || September 16, 2006 || Catalina || CSS || — || align=right | 4.4 km || 
|-id=793 bgcolor=#d6d6d6
| 248793 ||  || — || September 18, 2006 || Kitt Peak || Spacewatch || MRC || align=right | 3.5 km || 
|-id=794 bgcolor=#d6d6d6
| 248794 ||  || — || September 18, 2006 || Kitt Peak || Spacewatch || — || align=right | 2.6 km || 
|-id=795 bgcolor=#E9E9E9
| 248795 ||  || — || September 18, 2006 || Kitt Peak || Spacewatch || MIS || align=right | 2.6 km || 
|-id=796 bgcolor=#d6d6d6
| 248796 ||  || — || September 19, 2006 || Catalina || CSS || URS || align=right | 4.9 km || 
|-id=797 bgcolor=#E9E9E9
| 248797 ||  || — || September 23, 2006 || Kitt Peak || Spacewatch || HNA || align=right | 2.4 km || 
|-id=798 bgcolor=#E9E9E9
| 248798 ||  || — || September 23, 2006 || Kitt Peak || Spacewatch || AST || align=right | 2.7 km || 
|-id=799 bgcolor=#d6d6d6
| 248799 ||  || — || September 24, 2006 || Anderson Mesa || LONEOS || SYL7:4 || align=right | 7.3 km || 
|-id=800 bgcolor=#E9E9E9
| 248800 ||  || — || September 18, 2006 || Catalina || CSS || — || align=right | 1.5 km || 
|}

248801–248900 

|-bgcolor=#d6d6d6
| 248801 ||  || — || September 19, 2006 || Catalina || CSS || — || align=right | 6.0 km || 
|-id=802 bgcolor=#E9E9E9
| 248802 ||  || — || September 21, 2006 || Anderson Mesa || LONEOS || — || align=right | 1.7 km || 
|-id=803 bgcolor=#E9E9E9
| 248803 ||  || — || September 19, 2006 || Anderson Mesa || LONEOS || NEM || align=right | 2.5 km || 
|-id=804 bgcolor=#E9E9E9
| 248804 ||  || — || September 16, 2006 || Catalina || CSS || — || align=right | 2.7 km || 
|-id=805 bgcolor=#E9E9E9
| 248805 ||  || — || September 16, 2006 || Catalina || CSS || — || align=right | 3.5 km || 
|-id=806 bgcolor=#E9E9E9
| 248806 ||  || — || September 19, 2006 || Kitt Peak || Spacewatch || AST || align=right | 3.1 km || 
|-id=807 bgcolor=#d6d6d6
| 248807 ||  || — || September 19, 2006 || Kitt Peak || Spacewatch || — || align=right | 3.1 km || 
|-id=808 bgcolor=#E9E9E9
| 248808 ||  || — || September 23, 2006 || Kitt Peak || Spacewatch || — || align=right | 1.7 km || 
|-id=809 bgcolor=#d6d6d6
| 248809 ||  || — || September 24, 2006 || Kitt Peak || Spacewatch || — || align=right | 5.5 km || 
|-id=810 bgcolor=#d6d6d6
| 248810 ||  || — || September 24, 2006 || Kitt Peak || Spacewatch || — || align=right | 4.9 km || 
|-id=811 bgcolor=#E9E9E9
| 248811 ||  || — || September 25, 2006 || Kitt Peak || Spacewatch || — || align=right | 3.7 km || 
|-id=812 bgcolor=#E9E9E9
| 248812 ||  || — || September 25, 2006 || Kitt Peak || Spacewatch || — || align=right | 3.8 km || 
|-id=813 bgcolor=#E9E9E9
| 248813 ||  || — || September 25, 2006 || Kitt Peak || Spacewatch || — || align=right | 2.7 km || 
|-id=814 bgcolor=#d6d6d6
| 248814 ||  || — || September 16, 2006 || Catalina || CSS || EUP || align=right | 4.4 km || 
|-id=815 bgcolor=#E9E9E9
| 248815 ||  || — || September 22, 2006 || Catalina || CSS || MAR || align=right | 1.4 km || 
|-id=816 bgcolor=#E9E9E9
| 248816 ||  || — || September 26, 2006 || Catalina || CSS || ADE || align=right | 2.7 km || 
|-id=817 bgcolor=#E9E9E9
| 248817 ||  || — || September 27, 2006 || Kitt Peak || Spacewatch || — || align=right | 2.2 km || 
|-id=818 bgcolor=#FFC2E0
| 248818 ||  || — || September 30, 2006 || Kitt Peak || Spacewatch || AMO +1km || align=right | 1.2 km || 
|-id=819 bgcolor=#E9E9E9
| 248819 ||  || — || September 26, 2006 || Kitt Peak || Spacewatch || — || align=right | 2.4 km || 
|-id=820 bgcolor=#d6d6d6
| 248820 ||  || — || September 26, 2006 || Catalina || CSS || — || align=right | 4.8 km || 
|-id=821 bgcolor=#E9E9E9
| 248821 ||  || — || September 26, 2006 || Kitt Peak || Spacewatch || — || align=right | 3.9 km || 
|-id=822 bgcolor=#fefefe
| 248822 ||  || — || September 27, 2006 || Kitt Peak || Spacewatch || ERI || align=right | 2.4 km || 
|-id=823 bgcolor=#E9E9E9
| 248823 ||  || — || September 28, 2006 || Socorro || LINEAR || — || align=right | 2.1 km || 
|-id=824 bgcolor=#E9E9E9
| 248824 ||  || — || September 29, 2006 || Anderson Mesa || LONEOS || — || align=right | 3.2 km || 
|-id=825 bgcolor=#E9E9E9
| 248825 ||  || — || September 26, 2006 || Catalina || CSS || — || align=right | 2.6 km || 
|-id=826 bgcolor=#E9E9E9
| 248826 ||  || — || September 27, 2006 || Kitt Peak || Spacewatch || PAD || align=right | 2.6 km || 
|-id=827 bgcolor=#d6d6d6
| 248827 ||  || — || September 27, 2006 || Kitt Peak || Spacewatch || — || align=right | 5.1 km || 
|-id=828 bgcolor=#d6d6d6
| 248828 ||  || — || September 28, 2006 || Kitt Peak || Spacewatch || — || align=right | 4.6 km || 
|-id=829 bgcolor=#E9E9E9
| 248829 ||  || — || September 30, 2006 || Catalina || CSS || — || align=right | 1.9 km || 
|-id=830 bgcolor=#E9E9E9
| 248830 ||  || — || September 30, 2006 || Catalina || CSS || — || align=right | 2.9 km || 
|-id=831 bgcolor=#E9E9E9
| 248831 ||  || — || September 30, 2006 || Catalina || CSS || — || align=right | 1.2 km || 
|-id=832 bgcolor=#d6d6d6
| 248832 ||  || — || September 30, 2006 || Catalina || CSS || HYG || align=right | 3.8 km || 
|-id=833 bgcolor=#E9E9E9
| 248833 ||  || — || September 30, 2006 || Mount Lemmon || Mount Lemmon Survey || — || align=right | 1.8 km || 
|-id=834 bgcolor=#E9E9E9
| 248834 ||  || — || September 25, 2006 || Catalina || CSS || EUN || align=right | 1.6 km || 
|-id=835 bgcolor=#C7FF8F
| 248835 ||  || — || September 16, 2006 || Apache Point || A. C. Becker, A. W. Puckett, J. Kubica || centaur || align=right | 78 km || 
|-id=836 bgcolor=#d6d6d6
| 248836 ||  || — || September 30, 2006 || Apache Point || A. C. Becker || — || align=right | 3.6 km || 
|-id=837 bgcolor=#E9E9E9
| 248837 ||  || — || September 28, 2006 || Mount Lemmon || Mount Lemmon Survey || — || align=right | 2.8 km || 
|-id=838 bgcolor=#d6d6d6
| 248838 ||  || — || September 26, 2006 || Mount Lemmon || Mount Lemmon Survey || LIX || align=right | 6.6 km || 
|-id=839 bgcolor=#E9E9E9
| 248839 Mazeikiai ||  ||  || September 25, 2006 || Moletai || K. Černis || — || align=right | 2.6 km || 
|-id=840 bgcolor=#E9E9E9
| 248840 ||  || — || October 1, 2006 || Hibiscus || S. F. Hönig || — || align=right | 3.0 km || 
|-id=841 bgcolor=#E9E9E9
| 248841 ||  || — || October 2, 2006 || Mount Lemmon || Mount Lemmon Survey || — || align=right | 2.2 km || 
|-id=842 bgcolor=#d6d6d6
| 248842 ||  || — || October 15, 2006 || Piszkéstető || K. Sárneczky, Z. Kuli || URS || align=right | 6.0 km || 
|-id=843 bgcolor=#E9E9E9
| 248843 ||  || — || October 10, 2006 || Palomar || NEAT || BRG || align=right | 1.6 km || 
|-id=844 bgcolor=#E9E9E9
| 248844 ||  || — || October 11, 2006 || Kitt Peak || Spacewatch || MIS || align=right | 2.7 km || 
|-id=845 bgcolor=#d6d6d6
| 248845 ||  || — || October 12, 2006 || Kitt Peak || Spacewatch || — || align=right | 4.3 km || 
|-id=846 bgcolor=#E9E9E9
| 248846 ||  || — || October 12, 2006 || Kitt Peak || Spacewatch || HOF || align=right | 2.9 km || 
|-id=847 bgcolor=#E9E9E9
| 248847 ||  || — || October 12, 2006 || Kitt Peak || Spacewatch || — || align=right | 2.5 km || 
|-id=848 bgcolor=#E9E9E9
| 248848 ||  || — || October 12, 2006 || Palomar || NEAT || — || align=right | 2.1 km || 
|-id=849 bgcolor=#E9E9E9
| 248849 ||  || — || October 15, 2006 || Kitt Peak || Spacewatch || — || align=right | 2.0 km || 
|-id=850 bgcolor=#E9E9E9
| 248850 ||  || — || October 9, 2006 || Palomar || NEAT || — || align=right | 2.0 km || 
|-id=851 bgcolor=#E9E9E9
| 248851 ||  || — || October 11, 2006 || Palomar || NEAT || — || align=right | 2.1 km || 
|-id=852 bgcolor=#fefefe
| 248852 ||  || — || October 11, 2006 || Palomar || NEAT || — || align=right | 2.2 km || 
|-id=853 bgcolor=#d6d6d6
| 248853 ||  || — || October 11, 2006 || Palomar || NEAT || — || align=right | 5.4 km || 
|-id=854 bgcolor=#E9E9E9
| 248854 ||  || — || October 11, 2006 || Palomar || NEAT || — || align=right | 2.7 km || 
|-id=855 bgcolor=#E9E9E9
| 248855 ||  || — || October 11, 2006 || Palomar || NEAT || DOR || align=right | 3.6 km || 
|-id=856 bgcolor=#E9E9E9
| 248856 ||  || — || October 13, 2006 || Kitt Peak || Spacewatch || HOF || align=right | 2.6 km || 
|-id=857 bgcolor=#E9E9E9
| 248857 ||  || — || October 15, 2006 || Kitt Peak || Spacewatch || — || align=right | 2.9 km || 
|-id=858 bgcolor=#d6d6d6
| 248858 ||  || — || October 15, 2006 || Kitt Peak || Spacewatch || EMA || align=right | 5.5 km || 
|-id=859 bgcolor=#E9E9E9
| 248859 ||  || — || October 15, 2006 || Kitt Peak || Spacewatch || HOF || align=right | 2.9 km || 
|-id=860 bgcolor=#E9E9E9
| 248860 ||  || — || October 16, 2006 || Goodricke-Pigott || R. A. Tucker || — || align=right | 2.3 km || 
|-id=861 bgcolor=#E9E9E9
| 248861 ||  || — || October 16, 2006 || Catalina || CSS || — || align=right data-sort-value="1" | 1000 m || 
|-id=862 bgcolor=#d6d6d6
| 248862 ||  || — || October 16, 2006 || Catalina || CSS || — || align=right | 5.7 km || 
|-id=863 bgcolor=#d6d6d6
| 248863 ||  || — || October 17, 2006 || Mount Lemmon || Mount Lemmon Survey || EUP || align=right | 6.4 km || 
|-id=864 bgcolor=#E9E9E9
| 248864 ||  || — || October 17, 2006 || Mount Lemmon || Mount Lemmon Survey || — || align=right | 2.1 km || 
|-id=865 bgcolor=#d6d6d6
| 248865 ||  || — || October 17, 2006 || Kitt Peak || Spacewatch || — || align=right | 4.8 km || 
|-id=866 bgcolor=#E9E9E9
| 248866 Margherita ||  ||  || October 17, 2006 || San Marcello || Pistoia Mountains Obs. || — || align=right | 1.4 km || 
|-id=867 bgcolor=#E9E9E9
| 248867 ||  || — || October 18, 2006 || Kitt Peak || Spacewatch || — || align=right | 2.4 km || 
|-id=868 bgcolor=#d6d6d6
| 248868 ||  || — || October 18, 2006 || Kitt Peak || Spacewatch || VER || align=right | 4.2 km || 
|-id=869 bgcolor=#E9E9E9
| 248869 ||  || — || October 16, 2006 || Catalina || CSS || — || align=right | 2.2 km || 
|-id=870 bgcolor=#d6d6d6
| 248870 ||  || — || October 17, 2006 || Kitt Peak || Spacewatch || — || align=right | 5.1 km || 
|-id=871 bgcolor=#E9E9E9
| 248871 ||  || — || October 17, 2006 || Kitt Peak || Spacewatch || AGN || align=right | 1.5 km || 
|-id=872 bgcolor=#E9E9E9
| 248872 ||  || — || October 18, 2006 || Kitt Peak || Spacewatch || KON || align=right | 3.3 km || 
|-id=873 bgcolor=#E9E9E9
| 248873 ||  || — || October 18, 2006 || Kitt Peak || Spacewatch || — || align=right | 2.7 km || 
|-id=874 bgcolor=#E9E9E9
| 248874 ||  || — || October 19, 2006 || Kitt Peak || Spacewatch || — || align=right | 2.2 km || 
|-id=875 bgcolor=#E9E9E9
| 248875 ||  || — || October 19, 2006 || Kitt Peak || Spacewatch || — || align=right | 2.5 km || 
|-id=876 bgcolor=#E9E9E9
| 248876 ||  || — || October 19, 2006 || Kitt Peak || Spacewatch || — || align=right | 3.1 km || 
|-id=877 bgcolor=#d6d6d6
| 248877 ||  || — || October 19, 2006 || Catalina || CSS || EOS || align=right | 3.5 km || 
|-id=878 bgcolor=#E9E9E9
| 248878 ||  || — || October 20, 2006 || Catalina || CSS || — || align=right | 2.3 km || 
|-id=879 bgcolor=#E9E9E9
| 248879 ||  || — || October 21, 2006 || Kitt Peak || Spacewatch || — || align=right | 2.8 km || 
|-id=880 bgcolor=#E9E9E9
| 248880 ||  || — || October 16, 2006 || Catalina || CSS || — || align=right | 5.0 km || 
|-id=881 bgcolor=#d6d6d6
| 248881 ||  || — || October 16, 2006 || Catalina || CSS || — || align=right | 6.4 km || 
|-id=882 bgcolor=#E9E9E9
| 248882 ||  || — || October 19, 2006 || Catalina || CSS || — || align=right | 1.9 km || 
|-id=883 bgcolor=#E9E9E9
| 248883 ||  || — || October 19, 2006 || Catalina || CSS || — || align=right | 2.2 km || 
|-id=884 bgcolor=#E9E9E9
| 248884 ||  || — || October 19, 2006 || Catalina || CSS || ADE || align=right | 2.1 km || 
|-id=885 bgcolor=#E9E9E9
| 248885 ||  || — || October 19, 2006 || Catalina || CSS || — || align=right | 2.8 km || 
|-id=886 bgcolor=#E9E9E9
| 248886 ||  || — || October 21, 2006 || Catalina || CSS || ADE || align=right | 2.6 km || 
|-id=887 bgcolor=#E9E9E9
| 248887 ||  || — || October 22, 2006 || Palomar || NEAT || — || align=right | 3.1 km || 
|-id=888 bgcolor=#E9E9E9
| 248888 ||  || — || October 16, 2006 || Mount Lemmon || Mount Lemmon Survey || — || align=right | 1.8 km || 
|-id=889 bgcolor=#E9E9E9
| 248889 ||  || — || October 16, 2006 || Catalina || CSS || — || align=right | 2.4 km || 
|-id=890 bgcolor=#E9E9E9
| 248890 ||  || — || October 17, 2006 || Catalina || CSS || — || align=right | 2.4 km || 
|-id=891 bgcolor=#E9E9E9
| 248891 ||  || — || October 20, 2006 || Palomar || NEAT || — || align=right | 1.6 km || 
|-id=892 bgcolor=#E9E9E9
| 248892 ||  || — || October 20, 2006 || Palomar || NEAT || — || align=right | 1.7 km || 
|-id=893 bgcolor=#E9E9E9
| 248893 ||  || — || October 23, 2006 || Catalina || CSS || EUN || align=right | 2.2 km || 
|-id=894 bgcolor=#d6d6d6
| 248894 ||  || — || October 27, 2006 || Kitt Peak || Spacewatch || — || align=right | 4.7 km || 
|-id=895 bgcolor=#E9E9E9
| 248895 ||  || — || October 27, 2006 || Catalina || CSS || — || align=right | 3.0 km || 
|-id=896 bgcolor=#d6d6d6
| 248896 ||  || — || October 27, 2006 || Mount Lemmon || Mount Lemmon Survey || — || align=right | 3.5 km || 
|-id=897 bgcolor=#E9E9E9
| 248897 ||  || — || October 27, 2006 || Kitt Peak || Spacewatch || — || align=right | 3.3 km || 
|-id=898 bgcolor=#E9E9E9
| 248898 ||  || — || October 28, 2006 || Kitt Peak || Spacewatch || — || align=right | 2.5 km || 
|-id=899 bgcolor=#d6d6d6
| 248899 ||  || — || October 28, 2006 || Mount Lemmon || Mount Lemmon Survey || ALA || align=right | 6.9 km || 
|-id=900 bgcolor=#E9E9E9
| 248900 ||  || — || October 17, 2006 || Catalina || CSS || — || align=right | 2.2 km || 
|}

248901–249000 

|-bgcolor=#d6d6d6
| 248901 ||  || — || October 16, 2006 || Kitt Peak || Spacewatch || MRC || align=right | 3.5 km || 
|-id=902 bgcolor=#E9E9E9
| 248902 ||  || — || October 20, 2006 || Catalina || CSS || — || align=right | 4.5 km || 
|-id=903 bgcolor=#E9E9E9
| 248903 ||  || — || October 22, 2006 || Mount Lemmon || Mount Lemmon Survey || HOF || align=right | 3.2 km || 
|-id=904 bgcolor=#E9E9E9
| 248904 || 2006 VE || — || November 1, 2006 || Wrightwood || J. W. Young || — || align=right | 1.8 km || 
|-id=905 bgcolor=#d6d6d6
| 248905 ||  || — || November 10, 2006 || Kitt Peak || Spacewatch || — || align=right | 5.6 km || 
|-id=906 bgcolor=#E9E9E9
| 248906 ||  || — || November 9, 2006 || Kitt Peak || Spacewatch || — || align=right | 2.9 km || 
|-id=907 bgcolor=#d6d6d6
| 248907 ||  || — || November 12, 2006 || Mount Lemmon || Mount Lemmon Survey || — || align=right | 5.0 km || 
|-id=908 bgcolor=#d6d6d6
| 248908 Ginostrada ||  ||  || November 15, 2006 || Vallemare di Borbona || V. S. Casulli || — || align=right | 4.3 km || 
|-id=909 bgcolor=#d6d6d6
| 248909 ||  || — || November 11, 2006 || Kitt Peak || Spacewatch || CHA || align=right | 3.3 km || 
|-id=910 bgcolor=#E9E9E9
| 248910 ||  || — || November 11, 2006 || Kitt Peak || Spacewatch || — || align=right | 4.1 km || 
|-id=911 bgcolor=#d6d6d6
| 248911 ||  || — || November 11, 2006 || Catalina || CSS || — || align=right | 4.6 km || 
|-id=912 bgcolor=#E9E9E9
| 248912 ||  || — || November 11, 2006 || Kitt Peak || Spacewatch || DOR || align=right | 4.0 km || 
|-id=913 bgcolor=#E9E9E9
| 248913 ||  || — || November 12, 2006 || Mount Lemmon || Mount Lemmon Survey || — || align=right | 2.5 km || 
|-id=914 bgcolor=#E9E9E9
| 248914 ||  || — || November 13, 2006 || Kitt Peak || Spacewatch || — || align=right | 2.6 km || 
|-id=915 bgcolor=#d6d6d6
| 248915 ||  || — || November 14, 2006 || Kitt Peak || Spacewatch || — || align=right | 3.1 km || 
|-id=916 bgcolor=#E9E9E9
| 248916 ||  || — || November 14, 2006 || Catalina || CSS || — || align=right | 1.8 km || 
|-id=917 bgcolor=#d6d6d6
| 248917 ||  || — || November 13, 2006 || Kitt Peak || Spacewatch || — || align=right | 4.2 km || 
|-id=918 bgcolor=#FA8072
| 248918 ||  || — || November 14, 2006 || Socorro || LINEAR || — || align=right | 2.1 km || 
|-id=919 bgcolor=#d6d6d6
| 248919 ||  || — || November 15, 2006 || Kitt Peak || Spacewatch || — || align=right | 3.8 km || 
|-id=920 bgcolor=#FA8072
| 248920 ||  || — || November 15, 2006 || Socorro || LINEAR || — || align=right | 2.2 km || 
|-id=921 bgcolor=#E9E9E9
| 248921 ||  || — || November 15, 2006 || Catalina || CSS || — || align=right | 2.1 km || 
|-id=922 bgcolor=#E9E9E9
| 248922 ||  || — || November 15, 2006 || Catalina || CSS || — || align=right | 3.2 km || 
|-id=923 bgcolor=#E9E9E9
| 248923 ||  || — || November 15, 2006 || Catalina || CSS || — || align=right | 3.7 km || 
|-id=924 bgcolor=#E9E9E9
| 248924 ||  || — || November 9, 2006 || Palomar || NEAT || ADE || align=right | 3.4 km || 
|-id=925 bgcolor=#E9E9E9
| 248925 ||  || — || November 13, 2006 || Apache Point || SDSS || HOF || align=right | 3.2 km || 
|-id=926 bgcolor=#FFC2E0
| 248926 ||  || — || November 17, 2006 || Catalina || CSS || AMO +1km || align=right | 2.9 km || 
|-id=927 bgcolor=#d6d6d6
| 248927 ||  || — || November 16, 2006 || Kitt Peak || Spacewatch || KOR || align=right | 1.9 km || 
|-id=928 bgcolor=#E9E9E9
| 248928 ||  || — || November 16, 2006 || Socorro || LINEAR || — || align=right | 3.3 km || 
|-id=929 bgcolor=#d6d6d6
| 248929 ||  || — || November 16, 2006 || Mount Lemmon || Mount Lemmon Survey || URS || align=right | 6.0 km || 
|-id=930 bgcolor=#E9E9E9
| 248930 ||  || — || November 17, 2006 || Mount Lemmon || Mount Lemmon Survey || — || align=right | 1.9 km || 
|-id=931 bgcolor=#d6d6d6
| 248931 ||  || — || November 18, 2006 || Socorro || LINEAR || EOS || align=right | 3.5 km || 
|-id=932 bgcolor=#E9E9E9
| 248932 ||  || — || November 18, 2006 || Kitt Peak || Spacewatch || — || align=right | 4.4 km || 
|-id=933 bgcolor=#E9E9E9
| 248933 ||  || — || November 16, 2006 || Catalina || CSS || — || align=right | 3.4 km || 
|-id=934 bgcolor=#d6d6d6
| 248934 ||  || — || November 16, 2006 || Kitt Peak || Spacewatch || KOR || align=right | 1.7 km || 
|-id=935 bgcolor=#E9E9E9
| 248935 ||  || — || November 16, 2006 || Kitt Peak || Spacewatch || — || align=right | 2.7 km || 
|-id=936 bgcolor=#d6d6d6
| 248936 ||  || — || November 17, 2006 || Kitt Peak || Spacewatch || HYG || align=right | 4.4 km || 
|-id=937 bgcolor=#d6d6d6
| 248937 ||  || — || November 17, 2006 || Mount Lemmon || Mount Lemmon Survey || EOS || align=right | 2.9 km || 
|-id=938 bgcolor=#E9E9E9
| 248938 ||  || — || November 18, 2006 || Kitt Peak || Spacewatch || — || align=right | 3.4 km || 
|-id=939 bgcolor=#d6d6d6
| 248939 ||  || — || November 19, 2006 || Socorro || LINEAR || — || align=right | 5.6 km || 
|-id=940 bgcolor=#d6d6d6
| 248940 ||  || — || November 19, 2006 || Kitt Peak || Spacewatch || — || align=right | 5.2 km || 
|-id=941 bgcolor=#E9E9E9
| 248941 ||  || — || November 20, 2006 || Catalina || CSS || — || align=right | 3.4 km || 
|-id=942 bgcolor=#E9E9E9
| 248942 ||  || — || November 22, 2006 || Catalina || CSS || MRX || align=right | 1.3 km || 
|-id=943 bgcolor=#E9E9E9
| 248943 ||  || — || November 18, 2006 || Catalina || CSS || TIN || align=right | 3.6 km || 
|-id=944 bgcolor=#d6d6d6
| 248944 ||  || — || November 19, 2006 || Kitt Peak || Spacewatch || KOR || align=right | 1.9 km || 
|-id=945 bgcolor=#d6d6d6
| 248945 ||  || — || November 20, 2006 || Kitt Peak || Spacewatch || HIL3:2 || align=right | 7.7 km || 
|-id=946 bgcolor=#d6d6d6
| 248946 ||  || — || November 20, 2006 || Socorro || LINEAR || EUP || align=right | 7.1 km || 
|-id=947 bgcolor=#d6d6d6
| 248947 ||  || — || November 21, 2006 || Mount Lemmon || Mount Lemmon Survey || — || align=right | 4.9 km || 
|-id=948 bgcolor=#d6d6d6
| 248948 ||  || — || November 23, 2006 || Kitt Peak || Spacewatch || — || align=right | 5.3 km || 
|-id=949 bgcolor=#d6d6d6
| 248949 ||  || — || November 25, 2006 || Kitt Peak || Spacewatch || EOS || align=right | 4.7 km || 
|-id=950 bgcolor=#d6d6d6
| 248950 ||  || — || November 24, 2006 || Mount Lemmon || Mount Lemmon Survey || — || align=right | 2.8 km || 
|-id=951 bgcolor=#E9E9E9
| 248951 ||  || — || December 13, 2006 || Vicques || M. Ory || — || align=right | 2.2 km || 
|-id=952 bgcolor=#E9E9E9
| 248952 ||  || — || December 1, 2006 || Catalina || CSS || — || align=right | 2.2 km || 
|-id=953 bgcolor=#d6d6d6
| 248953 ||  || — || December 10, 2006 || Kitt Peak || Spacewatch || — || align=right | 4.3 km || 
|-id=954 bgcolor=#E9E9E9
| 248954 ||  || — || December 10, 2006 || Kitt Peak || Spacewatch || — || align=right | 3.4 km || 
|-id=955 bgcolor=#d6d6d6
| 248955 ||  || — || December 11, 2006 || Kitt Peak || Spacewatch || EUP || align=right | 5.5 km || 
|-id=956 bgcolor=#d6d6d6
| 248956 ||  || — || December 13, 2006 || Mount Lemmon || Mount Lemmon Survey || — || align=right | 4.4 km || 
|-id=957 bgcolor=#d6d6d6
| 248957 ||  || — || December 14, 2006 || Socorro || LINEAR || — || align=right | 3.7 km || 
|-id=958 bgcolor=#d6d6d6
| 248958 ||  || — || December 15, 2006 || Socorro || LINEAR || — || align=right | 7.1 km || 
|-id=959 bgcolor=#E9E9E9
| 248959 ||  || — || December 13, 2006 || Socorro || LINEAR || — || align=right | 1.5 km || 
|-id=960 bgcolor=#d6d6d6
| 248960 ||  || — || December 17, 2006 || Mount Lemmon || Mount Lemmon Survey || URS || align=right | 4.1 km || 
|-id=961 bgcolor=#d6d6d6
| 248961 ||  || — || December 16, 2006 || Mount Lemmon || Mount Lemmon Survey || HYG || align=right | 4.8 km || 
|-id=962 bgcolor=#E9E9E9
| 248962 ||  || — || December 17, 2006 || Mount Lemmon || Mount Lemmon Survey || — || align=right | 3.3 km || 
|-id=963 bgcolor=#d6d6d6
| 248963 ||  || — || December 20, 2006 || Palomar || NEAT || — || align=right | 4.0 km || 
|-id=964 bgcolor=#d6d6d6
| 248964 ||  || — || December 21, 2006 || Palomar || NEAT || JLI || align=right | 5.6 km || 
|-id=965 bgcolor=#E9E9E9
| 248965 ||  || — || December 21, 2006 || Kitt Peak || Spacewatch || HOF || align=right | 3.5 km || 
|-id=966 bgcolor=#d6d6d6
| 248966 ||  || — || December 21, 2006 || Catalina || CSS || — || align=right | 5.8 km || 
|-id=967 bgcolor=#d6d6d6
| 248967 || 2007 AF || — || January 7, 2007 || Eskridge || G. Hug || — || align=right | 6.1 km || 
|-id=968 bgcolor=#d6d6d6
| 248968 ||  || — || January 24, 2007 || Catalina || CSS || URS || align=right | 4.7 km || 
|-id=969 bgcolor=#fefefe
| 248969 ||  || — || January 24, 2007 || Socorro || LINEAR || — || align=right | 1.4 km || 
|-id=970 bgcolor=#d6d6d6
| 248970 Giannimorandi ||  ||  || January 19, 2007 || Vallemare di Borbona || V. S. Casulli || URS || align=right | 5.5 km || 
|-id=971 bgcolor=#d6d6d6
| 248971 ||  || — || January 24, 2007 || Kitt Peak || Spacewatch || — || align=right | 5.3 km || 
|-id=972 bgcolor=#E9E9E9
| 248972 ||  || — || February 6, 2007 || Mount Lemmon || Mount Lemmon Survey || — || align=right | 3.3 km || 
|-id=973 bgcolor=#d6d6d6
| 248973 ||  || — || February 6, 2007 || Mount Lemmon || Mount Lemmon Survey || — || align=right | 4.1 km || 
|-id=974 bgcolor=#d6d6d6
| 248974 ||  || — || February 18, 2007 || Calvin-Rehoboth || Calvin–Rehoboth Obs. || — || align=right | 4.1 km || 
|-id=975 bgcolor=#E9E9E9
| 248975 ||  || — || February 17, 2007 || Kitt Peak || Spacewatch || — || align=right | 3.9 km || 
|-id=976 bgcolor=#C2FFFF
| 248976 ||  || — || February 23, 2007 || Kitt Peak || Spacewatch || L5 || align=right | 10 km || 
|-id=977 bgcolor=#fefefe
| 248977 ||  || — || February 16, 2007 || Catalina || CSS || H || align=right data-sort-value="0.78" | 780 m || 
|-id=978 bgcolor=#C2FFFF
| 248978 ||  || — || February 23, 2007 || Kitt Peak || Spacewatch || L5 || align=right | 10 km || 
|-id=979 bgcolor=#C2FFFF
| 248979 ||  || — || February 23, 2007 || Kitt Peak || Spacewatch || L5 || align=right | 10 km || 
|-id=980 bgcolor=#d6d6d6
| 248980 ||  || — || February 23, 2007 || Mount Lemmon || Mount Lemmon Survey || — || align=right | 3.3 km || 
|-id=981 bgcolor=#d6d6d6
| 248981 ||  || — || March 9, 2007 || Kitt Peak || Spacewatch || — || align=right | 4.8 km || 
|-id=982 bgcolor=#fefefe
| 248982 ||  || — || March 10, 2007 || Mount Lemmon || Mount Lemmon Survey || ERI || align=right | 2.8 km || 
|-id=983 bgcolor=#d6d6d6
| 248983 ||  || — || March 9, 2007 || Kitt Peak || Spacewatch || HYG || align=right | 4.3 km || 
|-id=984 bgcolor=#d6d6d6
| 248984 ||  || — || March 10, 2007 || Mount Lemmon || Mount Lemmon Survey || — || align=right | 4.4 km || 
|-id=985 bgcolor=#C2FFFF
| 248985 ||  || — || March 12, 2007 || Mount Lemmon || Mount Lemmon Survey || L5 || align=right | 10 km || 
|-id=986 bgcolor=#C2FFFF
| 248986 ||  || — || March 12, 2007 || Mount Lemmon || Mount Lemmon Survey || L5 || align=right | 17 km || 
|-id=987 bgcolor=#fefefe
| 248987 ||  || — || March 14, 2007 || Mount Lemmon || Mount Lemmon Survey || ERI || align=right | 1.9 km || 
|-id=988 bgcolor=#d6d6d6
| 248988 ||  || — || March 9, 2007 || Mount Lemmon || Mount Lemmon Survey || — || align=right | 3.1 km || 
|-id=989 bgcolor=#d6d6d6
| 248989 ||  || — || March 8, 2007 || Palomar || NEAT || — || align=right | 6.3 km || 
|-id=990 bgcolor=#C2FFFF
| 248990 ||  || — || March 18, 2007 || Nyukasa || Mount Nyukasa Stn. || L5 || align=right | 16 km || 
|-id=991 bgcolor=#C2FFFF
| 248991 ||  || — || March 20, 2007 || Kitt Peak || Spacewatch || L5 || align=right | 12 km || 
|-id=992 bgcolor=#fefefe
| 248992 ||  || — || April 8, 2007 || Kitt Peak || Spacewatch || — || align=right | 1.6 km || 
|-id=993 bgcolor=#fefefe
| 248993 Jonava ||  ||  || April 14, 2007 || Moletai || K. Černis, J. Zdanavičius || KLI || align=right | 2.5 km || 
|-id=994 bgcolor=#fefefe
| 248994 ||  || — || April 14, 2007 || Kitt Peak || Spacewatch || — || align=right | 1.9 km || 
|-id=995 bgcolor=#fefefe
| 248995 ||  || — || April 20, 2007 || Kitt Peak || Spacewatch || NYS || align=right | 2.2 km || 
|-id=996 bgcolor=#C2FFFF
| 248996 ||  || — || April 22, 2007 || Mount Lemmon || Mount Lemmon Survey || L5 || align=right | 16 km || 
|-id=997 bgcolor=#E9E9E9
| 248997 ||  || — || April 24, 2007 || Kitt Peak || Spacewatch || DOR || align=right | 3.6 km || 
|-id=998 bgcolor=#fefefe
| 248998 ||  || — || May 10, 2007 || Mount Lemmon || Mount Lemmon Survey || V || align=right | 1.8 km || 
|-id=999 bgcolor=#fefefe
| 248999 ||  || — || May 10, 2007 || Mount Lemmon || Mount Lemmon Survey || NYS || align=right | 1.9 km || 
|-id=000 bgcolor=#d6d6d6
| 249000 ||  || — || May 10, 2007 || Kitt Peak || Spacewatch || — || align=right | 3.3 km || 
|}

References

External links 
 Discovery Circumstances: Numbered Minor Planets (245001)–(250000) (IAU Minor Planet Center)

0248